This is a list of foreign players in Major League Soccer. The following players:
Have played at least one MLS regular season game. Players who were signed by MLS clubs, but only played in playoff games, U.S. Open Cup games, or did not play in any competitive games at all, are not included.
Are considered foreign, i.e., outside Canada or the United States determined by the following:
''A player is considered foreign if he is not eligible to play for the national team of Canada or the United States.
More specifically,
If a player has been capped on international level, the national team is used; if he has been capped by more than one country, the highest level (or the most recent) team is used. These include American and Canadian players with dual citizenship.
If a player has not been capped on international level, his country of birth is used, except those who were born abroad from American or Canadian parents, or moved to Canada or the United States at a young age, and those who clearly indicated to have switched his nationality to another nation.

Up to now, 135 different nations have been represented in MLS. Equatorial Guinea was the most recent nation to be represented when Carlos Akapo made his MLS debut playing for San Jose Earthquakes.

In bold: players who have played at least one MLS game in the most recent season (2023 Major League Soccer season), and are still at the clubs for which they have played. This does not include current players of a MLS club who have not played a MLS game in the current season.

Africa (CAF)

Algeria 
Raïs M'Bolhi – Philadelphia – 2014–15
Saphir Taïder – Montreal  – 2018–20

Angola 
Edgar Bartolomeu – MetroStars – 2003
Fernando Fernandes – MetroStars – 1999
Bruno Gaspar – Vancouver – 2021 
Jerson Monteiro – Chicago – 2007

Benin 
Femi Hollinger-Janzen – New England – 2016–18
Cédric Hountondji – New York City FC – 2018

Botswana 
Dipsy Selolwane – Chicago, Salt Lake – 2002–05

Burkina Faso 
Ousseni Bouda – San Jose – 2022–

Burundi 
Irakoze Donasiyano – Nashville – 2021

Cameroon 
Anatole Abang – New York Red Bulls – 2015–16
Brian Anunga – Nashville – 2020–
Stephane Assengue – New England – 2009
Yazid Atouba – Chicago – 2013
Eric Ayuk – Philadelphia – 2015–16
Samuel Ekemé – Kansas City – 1996
Charles Eloundou – Colorado – 2014–15
Wilfrid Kaptoum – New England – 2021–22
Olivier Mbaizo – Philadelphia – 2018–
Matthew Mbuta – New York Red Bulls – 2008–09
Alexandre Morfaw – Vancouver – 2011
Joseph Nane – Toronto, Colorado – 2010–12
Hassan Ndam – New York Red Bulls – 2017–18, 2022–
Alain N'Kong – Chicago – 2005–06
Marius Obekop – New York Red Bulls – 2013–15
Ambroise Oyongo – New York Red Bulls, Montreal – 2014–17
Frantz Pangop – Minnesota – 2018
Franck Songo'o – Portland – 2012
Tony Tchani – New York Red Bulls, Toronto, Columbus, Vancouver, Chicago – 2010–18
Nouhou Tolo – Seattle – 2017–

Cape Verde 
Paulo Dos Santos – New England – 1999
Jair – New England, San Jose, Tampa Bay – 1998–99, 2001
Jamiro Monteiro – Philadelphia, San Jose – 2019–
Kévin Oliveira – Kansas City – 2017

Central African Republic 
Wilfried Zahibo – New England, Houston – 2018–21

DR Congo 
Dimitry Imbongo – New England – 2012–14
Phanuel Kavita – Salt Lake – 2015–16
Jojea Kwizera – Montréal – 2022–
Larrys Mabiala – Portland – 2017–
Cedrick Mabwati – Columbus – 2015–16
Chris Mavinga – Toronto, LA Galaxy – 2017–
Danny Mwanga – Philadelphia, Portland, Colorado, Orlando – 2010–15
Ange N'Silu – D.C. United – 2009
Michee Ngalina – Philadelphia, Los Angeles FC – 2019, 2021
Steve Zakuani – Seattle, Portland – 2009–14

Egypt 
Omar Gaber – Los Angeles FC – 2018
Ali Ghazal – Vancouver – 2017–18
Ahmed Hamdi – Montreal – 2021–
Amro Tarek – Columbus, Orlando, New York Red Bulls – 2016, 2018–21

Equatorial Guinea 
Carlos Akapo – San Jose – 2023–

Eritrea 
Henok Goitom – San Jose – 2016
Mohammed Saeid – Columbus, Minnesota, Colorado – 2015–17

Ethiopia 
Fuad Ibrahim – Toronto – 2008–10

Gabon 
Denis Bouanga – Los Angeles FC – 2022–

Gambia 
Mamadou Danso – Portland, Montreal – 2011–14
Emmanuel Gómez – Toronto – 2009
Modou Jadama – Portland – 2018–19
Mustapha Jarju – Vancouver – 2011
Omar Jasseh – San Jose – 2010–11
Ismaila Jome – Minnesota, Portland – 2017, 2021
Kekuta Manneh – Vancouver, Columbus, Cincinnati, New England, Austin – 2013–17, 2019–21
Abdoulie Mansally – New England, Salt Lake, Houston – 2007–16
Sainey Nyassi – New England, D.C. United – 2007–13
Sanna Nyassi – Seattle, Colorado, Montreal, Chicago, San Jose – 2009–15
Amadou Sanyang – Toronto, Seattle – 2009–11
Omar Sowe – New York Red Bulls – 2021

Ghana 
Mohammed Abu – Columbus, D.C. United – 2017–18, 2020
Lalas Abubakar – Columbus, Colorado – 2017–
David Accam – Chicago, Philadelphia, Columbus, Nashville – 2015–20
Joe Addo – Tampa Bay, MetroStars – 1999–2003
Bismark Adjei-Boateng – Colorado – 2017–18
Harrison Afful – Columbus, Charlotte – 2015–
Junior Agogo – Chicago, Colorado, San Jose – 2000–01
Kalif Alhassan – Portland – 2011–14
Emmanuel Appiah – Kansas City – 2016
Samuel Appiah – Houston – 2010
Isaac Atanga – Cincinnati – 2021–
Francis Atuahene – Dallas – 2019
Gideon Baah – New York Red Bulls – 2016
Fifi Baiden – Columbus – 2014
Latif Blessing – Kansas City, Los Angeles FC, New England – 2017–
Emmanuel Boateng – LA Galaxy, D.C. United, Columbus, New England – 2016–22
Abu Danladi – Minnesota, Nashville – 2017–22
Edwin Gyasi – Dallas – 2019
Salou Ibrahim – New York Red Bulls – 2010
Sumed Ibrahim – Chicago – 2004
Samuel Inkoom – D.C. United – 2014
Louis Ken-Kwofie – MetroStars – 1996
Gershon Koffie – Vancouver, New England – 2011–17
Nana Kuffour – D.C. United – 2004–05
Adam Larsen Kwarasey – Portland – 2015–16
Jonathan Mensah – Columbus, San Jose – 2017–
Patrick Nyarko – Chicago, D.C. United – 2008–17
Anthony Obodai – Houston – 2010
Dominic Oduro – Dallas, New York Red Bulls, Houston, Chicago, Columbus, Toronto, Montreal, San Jose – 2006–18
Ebenezer Ofori – New York City FC – 2018–19
Kofi Opare – LA Galaxy, D.C. United, Colorado – 2013–19
Edward Opoku – Columbus – 2018
Kwadwo Opoku – Los Angeles FC – 2020–
Emmanuel Osei – New England – 2009–10
Leonard Owusu – Vancouver – 2020–22
Samuel Owusu – New York City FC – 2022–
Kwadwo Poku – New York City FC – 2015–16
Lloyd Sam – New York Red Bulls, D.C. United – 2012–17
Samuel Tetteh – New York Red Bulls – 2020
Ema Twumasi – Dallas – 2018–
Joshua Yaro – Philadelphia – 2016–18
Ishmael Yartey – Portland – 2015
Yaw Yeboah – Columbus – 2022–

Guinea 
Hadji Barry – Orlando – 2016–17
Lass Bangoura – Vancouver – 2019
Florentin Pogba – Atlanta – 2019

Guinea-Bissau 
Gerso Fernandes – Kansas City – 2017–20
Janio Bikel – Vancouver – 2020–21
Nanu – Dallas – 2022
Sambinha – New England – 2016

Ivory Coast 
Benjamin Angoua – New England – 2017
Yannick Boli – Colorado – 2018
Didier Drogba – Montreal – 2015–16
Jean-Martial Kipré – Salt Lake – 2007
Guy-Roland Kpene – D.C. United – 2007
Aké Arnaud Loba – Nashville – 2021–22
Arsène Oka – New England – 2007
Gaoussou Samaké – D.C. United – 2022–
Olivier Tébily – Toronto – 2008
Abdoul Zanne – D.C. United – 2022

Kenya 
Lawrence Olum – Kansas City, Portland, Minnesota – 2011–14, 2016–19
Abdi Salim – Orlando – 2023–
Victor Wanyama – Montreal – 2020–

Liberia 
Michael Butler – MetroStars – 2001
Louis Crayton – D.C. United – 2008–09
Francis Doe – New York Red Bulls, D.C. United – 2007–09
Sam Forko – MetroStars – 2002
Willis Forko – Salt Lake – 2006–07
Chris Gbandi – Dallas – 2003–07
Sam Johnson – Salt Lake – 2019–20
Zizi Roberts – Colorado – 2003–04
Musa Shannon – Tampa Bay, Colorado – 1997–99, 2002
Adam Smarte – San Jose – 2008
Melvin Tarley – Salt Lake, Colorado – 2005–06
Patrick Weah – Minnesota – 2021

Libya 
Mohamed El Monir – Orlando, Los Angeles FC – 2018–20
Ismael Tajouri-Shradi – New York City FC, Los Angeles FC – 2018–22

Madagascar 
Romain Métanire – Minnesota – 2019–22
Rayan Raveloson – LA Galaxy – 2021–22

Mali 
Kalifa Cissé – New England – 2013
Youba Diarra – New York Red Bulls – 2021
Bakaye Dibassy – Minnesota – 2020–
Daouda Kanté – New England – 2002–04
Ibrahim Kante – New England – 2003
Bakary Soumaré – Chicago, Philadelphia, Montreal – 2007–09, 2012–15
Djimi Traoré – Seattle – 2013–14

Morocco 
Mehdi Ballouchy – Salt Lake, Colorado, New York Red Bulls, San Jose, Vancouver, New York City FC – 2006–16
Amine Bassi – Houston – 2023–
Ahmed Kantari – Toronto – 2015
Youness Mokhtar – Columbus – 2019–20
Adrien Regattin – Cincinnati – 2020
Monsef Zerka – New England – 2011

Mozambique 
Chiquinho Conde – New England, Tampa Bay – 1997
Tico-Tico – Tampa Bay – 2000

Nigeria 
Ifunanyachi Achara – Toronto – 2020–22
Fanendo Adi – Portland, Cincinnati, Columbus, Minnesota – 2014–21
William Agada – Kansas City – 2022–
Ade Akinbiyi – Houston – 2009
Gbenga Arokoyo – Portland – 2016
Bright Dike – Portland, Toronto – 2011–15
Connally Edozien – New England – 2005
Emmanuel Ekpo – Columbus – 2008–11
Michael Emenalo – San Jose – 1996–97
Sunusi Ibrahim – Montreal – 2021–
James Igbekeme – Columbus – 2022
Kennedy Igboananike – Chicago, D.C. United – 2015–16
Nosa Igiebor – Vancouver – 2017
Benedict Iroha – D.C. United – 1997
Obafemi Martins – Seattle – 2013–15
Manny Motajo – LA Galaxy, New England – 1996, 1998–99
Obinna Nwobodo – Cincinnati – 2022–
Chinonso Offor – Chicago, Montreal – 2021–
Uche Okafor – Kansas City – 1996–2000
Francis Okaroh – New England, Chicago, Miami Fusion – 1996–2000
Orji Okwonkwo – Montreal – 2019–20
Rasheed Olabiyi – Houston – 2015
Patrick Olalere – New England – 1997
Tani Oluwaseyi – Minnesota – 2023–
Stephen Sunday – Salt Lake – 2016–18

Rwanda 
Abdul Rwatubyaye – Kansas City – 2019

Senegal 
Dominique Badji – Colorado, Dallas, Nashville, Cincinnati – 2015–
Bouna Coundoul – Colorado, New York Red Bulls – 2006–11
Mamadou Diallo – Tampa Bay, New England, MetroStars – 2000–02
Zakaria Diallo – Montreal – 2019
Birahim Diop – MetroStars, Kansas City – 2002, 2010–11
Clément Diop – LA Galaxy, Montreal, Inter Miami  – 2016–17, 2019–22
Moussa Djitté – Austin – 2021–22
Mamadou Fall – Los Angeles FC – 2021–22
Macoumba Kandji – New York Red Bulls, Colorado, Houston – 2008–12
Joseph Niouky – New England – 2010
Lamine Sané – Orlando – 2018–19
Khaly Thiam – Chicago – 2016
Mohamed Traore – Los Angeles FC – 2020

Seychelles 
Michael Mancienne – New England – 2018–20

Sierra Leone 
Abdul Thompson Conteh – San Jose, D.C. United – 2000–02
Alhaji Kamara – D.C. United – 2016–17
Kei Kamara – Columbus, San Jose, Houston, Kansas City, New England, Vancouver, Colorado, Minnesota, Montréal, Chicago – 2006–13, 2015–20, 2022–
Michael Lahoud – Chivas USA, Philadelphia – 2009–15
Augustine Williams – LA Galaxy – 2021

Somalia 
Handwalla Bwana – Seattle, Nashville – 2018–22
Siad Haji – San Jose – 2019–22

South Africa 
Stephen Armstrong – D.C. United, Kansas City, Columbus – 2001–03, 2005
Derek Backman – Tampa Bay – 1996–97
Shaun Bartlett – Colorado, MetroStars – 1996–97
Njabulo Blom – St. Louis – 2023–
Danleigh Borman – New York Red Bulls, Toronto – 2008–11
Richard Farrer – Dallas – 1996–2002
Bongokuhle Hlongwane – Minnesota – 2022–
Doctor Khumalo – Columbus – 1996–97
Thabiso Khumalo – D.C. United – 2008–10
Ivan McKinley – Tampa Bay, New England, Miami Fusion, D.C. United – 1996–2002
Lindo Mfeka – San Jose – 2017
Kamohelo Mokotjo – Cincinnati – 2020–21
Toni Nhleko – Dallas – 2003–04
Tsiki Ntsabeleng – Dallas – 2022–
Ethen Sampson – Vancouver – 2014–15
Davide Somma – San Jose – 2008–09

South Sudan 
Machop Chol – Atlanta – 2021–

Tanzania 
Bernard Kamungo – Dallas – 2022–
Nizar Khalfan – Vancouver – 2011

Togo 
Abbe Ibrahim – MetroStars, Toronto – 2005, 2007

Tunisia 
Jasser Khmiri – Vancouver – 2019–20

Uganda 
Micheal Azira – Seattle, Colorado, Montreal, Chicago – 2014–20
Tenywa Bonseu – Chicago, Columbus, Dallas, MetroStars – 2000–04
Peter Byaruhanga – Kansas City – 2000
Joel Kitamirike – Columbus – 2006
Edward Kizza – New England – 2021
Mustafa Kizza – Montreal – 2020–21
Ibrahim Sekagya – New York Red Bulls – 2013–14
Robert Ssejjemba – D.C. United – 2006
Steven Sserwadda – New York Red Bulls – 2022–
Brian Umony – Portland – 2011

Zambia 

Aimé Mabika – Inter Miami – 2021–

Zimbabwe 
Mubarike Chisoni – LA Galaxy – 2005
Kheli Dube – New England – 2008–11
Neathan Gibson – Colorado – 2001
Teenage Hadebe – Houston – 2021–
Joseph Ngwenya – LA Galaxy, Columbus, Houston, D.C. United – 2004–07, 2010–11
Vitalis Takawira – Kansas City – 1996–99

Asia (AFC)

Afghanistan 
Adam Najem – Philadelphia – 2017

Australia 
Danny Allsopp – D.C. United – 2010
Tim Cahill – New York Red Bulls – 2012–14
David Carney – New York Red Bulls – 2013
Miloš Degenek – Columbus – 2022–
Alex Gersbach – Colorado – 2023–
Bernie Ibini-Isei – Vancouver – 2017–18
Andy Rose – Seattle, Vancouver – 2012–15, 2019–21
Brad Smith – Seattle, D.C. United – 2018–22

China 
Tan Long – Vancouver, D.C. United – 2011–12

Guam 
A. J. DeLaGarza – LA Galaxy, Houston, Inter Miami, New England – 2009–22
Ryan Guy – New England – 2011–13
Brandon McDonald – LA Galaxy, San Jose, D.C. United, Salt Lake – 2008–13
Erik Ustruck – Houston – 2009

Iran 
Khodadad Azizi – San Jose – 2000
Steven Beitashour – San Jose, Vancouver, Toronto, Los Angeles FC, Colorado – 2010–19, 2021–
Mohammad Khakpour – MetroStars – 1999–2000
Arash Noamouz – LA Galaxy – 1996

Iraq 
Ali Adnan – Vancouver – 2019–20
Mohanad Jeahze – D.C. United – 2023–
Justin Meram – Columbus, Orlando, Atlanta, Salt Lake – 2011–

Japan 
Jun Marques Davidson – Vancouver – 2012–13
Tsubasa Endoh – Toronto– 2016–17, 2019–21
Akira Kaji – Chivas USA – 2014
Kosuke Kimura – Colorado, Portland, New York Red Bulls – 2007–14
Daigo Kobayashi – Vancouver, New England – 2013–17
Ken Krolicki – Montreal – 2018–19
Yuya Kubo – Cincinnati – 2020–
Masato Kudo – Vancouver – 2016
Yohei Takaoka – Vancouver – 2023–
Terukazu Tanaka – Salt Lake – 2012

Korea Republic 
Hong Myung-bo – LA Galaxy – 2003–04
Hwang In-beom – Vancouver – 2019–20
Kim Kee-hee – Seattle – 2018–19
Kim Moon-hwan – Los Angeles FC – 2021–22
Lee Young-pyo – Vancouver – 2012–13

Lebanon 
Soony Saad – Kansas City – 2011–14, 2017

Northern Mariana Islands 
Johann Noetzel – Dallas – 2000

Palestine 
Nazmi Albadawi – Cincinnati – 2019
Shaker Asad – New England – 2000–02

Philippines 
Demitrius Omphroy – Toronto – 2011
Martin Steuble – Kansas City – 2014

Syria 
Gabriel Somi – New England – 2018

Thailand 
Anthony Ampaipitakwong – San Jose – 2011

Europe (UEFA)

Albania 
Shkëlzen Gashi – Colorado– 2016–18
Jahmir Hyka – San Jose – 2017–18
Hamdi Salihi – D.C. United – 2012
Giacomo Vrioni – New England – 2022–

Armenia 
Artur Aghasyan – Salt Lake – 2011
David Arshakyan – Chicago – 2016–17
Harut Karapetyan – LA Galaxy, San Jose, Tampa Bay – 1996–2000
Yura Movsisyan – Kansas City, Salt Lake, Chicago – 2006–09, 2016–18
Lucas Zelarayán – Columbus – 2020–

Austria 
Christian Fuchs – Charlotte – 2022
Michael Gspurning – Seattle – 2012–13
Andi Herzog – LA Galaxy – 2004
Andreas Ivanschitz – Seattle – 2015–16
Ercan Kara – Orlando – 2022–
Ernst Öbster – New York Red Bulls – 2009
Thomas Piermayr – Colorado – 2014
Emanuel Pogatetz – Columbus – 2014–15
Daniel Royer – New York Red Bulls – 2016–21
Alessandro Schöpf – Vancouver – 2022–
Markus Schopp – New York Red Bulls – 2006–07

Belarus 
Sasha Gotsmanov – Colorado – 2005

Belgium 
Christian Benteke – D.C. United – 2022–
Laurent Ciman – Montreal, Los Angeles FC, Toronto – 2015–20
Nansha Kalonji – MetroStars – 1999
Roland Lamah – Dallas, Cincinnati – 2017–19
Logan Ndenbe – Kansas City – 2022–
Jelle Van Damme – LA Galaxy – 2016–17
Dante Vanzeir – New York Red Bulls – 2023–
Mikael Yourassowsky – Toronto – 2011

Bosnia and Herzegovina 
Said Fazlagić – D.C. United – 1996
Baggio Hušidić – Chicago, LA Galaxy – 2009–11, 2014–18
Haris Medunjanin – Philadelphia, Cincinnati – 2017–22
Beni Redžić – Dallas – 2022
Refik Šabanadžović – Kansas City – 1998–99
Siniša Ubiparipović – New York Red Bulls, Montreal – 2007–10, 2012–13

Bulgaria 
Kalin Bankov – Tampa Bay – 2000–01
Stefan Dimitrov – Chicago – 2009–10
Galin Ivanov – D.C. United – 2003
Stanislav Ivanov – Chicago – 2021–22
Anton Nedyalkov – Dallas – 2018
Hristo Stoichkov – Chicago, D.C. United – 2000–03

Croatia 
Leonard Bisaku – Columbus – 2006
Stipe Biuk – Los Angeles FC – 2023–
Toni Datković – Salt Lake – 2021
Goran Hunjak – Tampa Bay, Kansas City – 1996, 1998
Kristijan Kahlina – Charlotte – 2022–
Franko Kovačević – Cincinnati – 2020–21
Damir Kreilach – Salt Lake – 2018–
Marko Marić – Chicago – 2011
Marko Marić – Houston – 2020–21
Josip Mikulić – Chicago – 2011
Roberto Punčec – Kansas City – 2020–21
Dario Župarić – Portland – 2020–

Cyprus 
Marinos Tzionis – Kansas City – 2022–

Czech Republic 
Bořek Dočkal – Philadelphia – 2018
Jani Galik – New England – 2006
Luboš Kubík – Chicago, Dallas – 1998–2001
Zdeněk Ondrášek – Dallas – 2019–20
Tomáš Ostrák – St. Louis – 2023–

Denmark 
Malte Amundsen – New York City FC – 2021–
Ronnie Ekelund – San Jose – 2001–04
Niko Hansen – Columbus, Houston, Minnesota – 2017–22
David Jensen – New York Red Bulls – 2020
Mathias Jørgensen – New York Red Bulls – 2019–20
Bashkim Kadrii – Minnesota – 2017
Emil Larsen – Columbus – 2016
Rajko Lekić – New England – 2011
Philip Lund – Seattle – 2013
Andreas Maxsø – Colorado – 2023–
Miklos Molnar – Kansas City – 2000
Younes Namli – Colorado – 2020–21
Brian Nielsen – New York Red Bulls – 2010–11
Jimmy Nielsen – Kansas City – 2010–13
David Ousted – Vancouver, D.C. United, Chicago – 2013–19
Christian Sivebæk – Seattle – 2012
Mikael Uhre – Philadelphia – 2022–

England 
Mo Adams – Chicago, Atlanta, Inter Miami – 2018–22
Korede Aiyegbusi – Kansas City – 2010–12
Brandon Austin – Orlando – 2021
Jack Barmby – Portland – 2016–18
David Beckham – LA Galaxy – 2007–12
Luis Binks – Montreal – 2020
Ian Bishop – Miami Fusion – 2001
Tyler Blackett – Cincinnati – 2021–22
Jamal Blackman – Los Angeles FC – 2021
Luke Boden – Orlando – 2015–16
Jonathan Bond – LA Galaxy – 2021–
John Bostock – Toronto – 2013
Chris Brown – Dallas – 1998
Ian Butterworth – Colorado – 1996
Nathan Byrne – Charlotte – 2022–
Tony Caig – Houston – 2008
Kasali Yinka Casal – D.C. United – 2007
Ashley Cole – LA Galaxy – 2016–18
Terry Cooke – Colorado – 2005–09
John Cunliffe – Chivas USA, San Jose – 2007–08
Jermain Defoe – Toronto – 2014
Danny Dichio – Toronto – 2007–09
Paul Dougherty – New York Red Bulls, Tampa Bay, Chicago, Colorado – 1998–2000
Andrew Driver – Houston – 2013–14
Richard Eckersley – Toronto, New York Red Bulls – 2011–14
Tom Edwards – New York Red Bulls – 2021–22
Mandela Egbo – New York Red Bulls – 2020–21
Jack Elliott – Philadelphia – 2017–
Hogan Ephraim – Toronto – 2013
Shay Facey – New York City FC – 2015
Ashley Fletcher – New York Red Bulls – 2022
Steven Gerrard – LA Galaxy – 2015–16
Kieran Gibbs – Inter Miami – 2021-22
Jason Griffiths – New England – 2010
Steve Guppy – D.C. United – 2005
Jack Gurr – Atlanta – 2021
Calvin Harris – Cincinnati – 2021–
Jack Harrison – New York City FC – 2016–17
Aidan Heaney – New England – 1996
Harrison Heath – Orlando, Atlanta, Minnesota – 2015–18
Seb Hines – Orlando – 2015–17
Joe Holland – Houston – 2017
Steve Howey – New England – 2004
Darren Huckerby – San Jose – 2008–09
Andy Iro – Columbus, Toronto – 2008–11
Danny Jackson – Colorado – 2002
Eddie Johnson – Portland – 2011
Matt Jones – Philadelphia – 2016
Zat Knight – Colorado – 2014
Frank Lampard – New York City FC – 2015–16
Tyrone Mears – Seattle, Atlanta, Minnesota – 2015–18
Luke Moore – Chivas USA, Toronto – 2014–15
Taylor Morgan – Toronto – 2013
Luke Mulholland – Salt Lake – 2014–19
Jordon Mutch – Vancouver – 2018
Lewis Neal – D.C. United, Orlando – 2012–15
Harvey Neville – Inter Miami – 2022–
Nedum Onuoha – Salt Lake – 2018–20
Bradley Orr – Toronto – 2014
Kyle Patterson – LA Galaxy – 2009
Dion Pereira – Atlanta – 2019
Jack Price – Colorado – 2018–
Nigel Reo-Coker – Vancouver, Chivas USA, Montreal – 2013–15
Rohan Ricketts – Toronto – 2008–09
Paul Rideout – Kansas City – 1998
Liam Ridgewell – Portland – 2014–18
Luke Rodgers – New York Red Bulls – 2011
John Rooney – New York Red Bulls – 2011
Wayne Rooney – D.C. United – 2018–19
Darel Russell – Toronto – 2013
Richard Sharpe – Colorado – 1996
Ryan Shawcross – Inter Miami – 2021
Jay Simpson – Philadelphia – 2017–18
Josh Sims – New York Red Bulls – 2019
Kimarni Smith – D.C. United – 2021–22
Ryan Smith – Kansas City, Chivas USA – 2010–12
Jordan Stewart – San Jose – 2013–16
Dan Stratford – D.C. United – 2008
Rob Vincent – D.C. United – 2016–17
Anton Walkes – Atlanta, Charlotte – 2017, 2020–22
Charlie Ward – Houston – 2017–18
Grant Ward – Chicago – 2014
Matt Watson – Vancouver, Chicago – 2012–15
Andy Welsh – Toronto – 2007
Ashley Westwood – Charlotte – 2023–
Mark Wilson – Dallas – 2005–06
Ian Woan – Columbus, Miami Fusion – 2001
Chris Woods – Colorado – 1996
Bradley Wright-Phillips – New York Red Bulls, Los Angeles FC, Columbus – 2013–21
Shaun Wright-Phillips – New York Red Bulls – 2015–16
Laurence Wyke – Atlanta – 2020
Dru Yearwood – New York Red Bulls – 2020–

Estonia 
Joel Lindpere – New York Red Bulls, Chicago – 2010–13
Erik Sorga – D.C. United – 2020–21

Finland 
Markus Halsti – D.C. United – 2015
Niko Hämäläinen – Los Angeles FC, LA Galaxy – 2019, 2021
Lassi Lappalainen – Montreal – 2019–
Robin Lod – Minnesota – 2019–
Jukka Raitala – Columbus, Montreal, Minnesota – 2017–21
Alexander Ring – New York City FC, Austin – 2017–
Rasmus Schüller – Minnesota – 2017–19
Toni Ståhl – Philadelphia – 2010
Antti Sumiala – Kansas City – 2005
Teemu Tainio – New York Red Bulls – 2011–12
Robert Taylor – Inter Miami – 2022–
Leo Väisänen – Austin – 2023–
Simo Valakari – Dallas – 2004–06
Mika Väyrynen – LA Galaxy – 2015

France 
Romain Alessandrini – LA Galaxy – 2017–19
Mouloud Akloul – Vancouver – 2011
Julien Baudet – Colorado – 2009–10
Pascal Bedrossian – Chicago – 2006–07
Nicolas Benezet – Toronto, Colorado, Seattle – 2019–21
Vincent Bezecourt – New York Red Bulls – 2017–19
Frédéric Brillant – New York City FC, D.C. United – 2016–21
Kévin Cabral – LA Galaxy, Colorado – 2021–
Rudy Camacho – Montreal – 2018–
Hassoun Camara – Montreal – 2012–17
Benoît Cheyrou – Toronto – 2015–17
Michaël Ciani – LA Galaxy – 2017–18
Abdoulaye Cissoko – Seattle – 2021–
Aurélien Collin – Kansas City, Orlando, New York Red Bulls, Philadelphia – 2011–19
Yohan Croizet – Kansas City – 2018–19
Séga Coulibaly – LA Galaxy – 2021–
Laurent Courtois – Chivas USA, LA Galaxy – 2011–13
Ousmane Dabo – New England – 2011
Mathieu Deplagne – Cincinnati – 2019–20
Bradley Diallo – LA Galaxy – 2017
Claude Dielna – New England, Portland – 2017–19
Sofiane Djeffal – D.C. United – 2022
Youri Djorkaeff – New York Red Bulls – 2005–06
Didier Domi – New England – 2011
Rod Fanni – Montreal – 2018–20
Samuel Grandsir – LA Galaxy – 2021–22
Léandre Griffit – Columbus – 2010–11
Eric Hassli – Vancouver, Toronto, Dallas – 2011–13
Thierry Henry – New York Red Bulls – 2010–14
Adrien Hunou – Minnesota – 2021–22
Elie Ikangu – New York Red Bulls – 2006–07
Nicolas Isimat-Mirin – Kansas City – 2021–22
Corentin Jean – Inter Miami – 2022–
Sébastien Le Toux – Seattle, Philadelphia, Vancouver, New York Red Bulls, Colorado, D.C. United – 2009–17
Peter Luccin – Dallas – 2013–14
Péguy Luyindula – New York Red Bulls – 2013–14
Adilson Malanda – Charlotte – 2022–
Paul Marie – San Jose – 2019–
Blaise Matuidi – Inter Miami – 2020–21
Laurent Merlin – Chivas USA – 2007
David Milinković – Vancouver – 2020
Wilfried Moimbé – Minnesota – 2019
Steven Moreira – Columbus – 2021–
Vincent Nogueira – Philadelphia – 2014–16
Jason Pendant – New York Red Bulls – 2020–22
Damien Perrinelle – New York Red Bulls – 2014–17
Jean-Baptiste Pierazzi – San Jose – 2014–15
Laurent Robert – Toronto – 2008
Bacary Sagna – Montreal – 2018–19
Saër Sène – New England, New York Red Bulls – 2012–14
Mikaël Silvestre – Portland – 2013
Clément Simonin – Toronto – 2015
Florent Sinama Pongolle – Chicago – 2014
Arnaud Souquet – Chicago – 2023–
Diedie Traore – LA Galaxy – 2019–20
Florian Valot – New York Red Bulls, Cincinnati – 2018–21
Rémi Walter – Kansas City – 2021–

Georgia 
Guram Kashia – San Jose – 2018–20
Valeri Qazaishvili – San Jose – 2017–20

Germany 
Stefan Aigner – Colorado – 2017–18
Julian Büscher – D.C. United – 2016–17
Rafael Czichos – Chicago – 2022–
Arne Friedrich – Chicago – 2012
Torsten Frings – Toronto – 2011–12
Andreas Görlitz – San Jose – 2014
Fabian Herbers – Philadelphia, Chicago – 2016–
Kai Herdling – Philadelphia – 2012
Florian Jungwirth – San Jose, Vancouver – 2017–22
Kevin Kratz – Atlanta – 2017–19
Kenneth Kronholm – Chicago – 2019–20
Florian Lechner – New England – 2012
Tim Leibold – Kansas City – 2023–
Jasper Löffelsend – Salt Lake – 2022–
Eduard Löwen – St. Louis – 2023–
Lothar Matthäus – MetroStars – 2000
Hany Mukhtar – Nashville – 2020–
Timo Pitter – Dallas – 2016
Frank Rost – New York Red Bulls – 2011
Marc Rzatkowski – New York Red Bulls – 2018–20
Bastian Schweinsteiger – Chicago – 2017–19
Amar Sejdić – Montréal, Atlanta – 2019–
Erik Thommy – Kansas City – 2022–
Christian Tiffert – Seattle – 2012
Timothy Tillman – Los Angeles FC – 2023–
Mandi Urbas – Dallas – 2003
Robert Voloder – Kansas City – 2022–
Kai Wagner – Philadelphia – 2019–
Gordon Wild – LA Galaxy – 2020

Greece 
Taxiarchis Fountas – D.C. United – 2022–
Giorgos Giakoumakis – Atlanta – 2023–
Ilias Iliadis – Montréal – 2023–
Alexandros Tabakis – Atlanta – 2017

Hungary 
Botond Baráth – Kansas City – 2019
Dániel Gazdag – Philadelphia – 2021–
Zoltán Hercegfalvi – Kansas City – 2009
Krisztián Németh – Kansas City, New England, Columbus – 2015, 2017–20
Nemanja Nikolić – Chicago – 2017–19
Dániel Sallói – Kansas City – 2017–
Szabolcs Schön – Dallas – 2021
Zoltán Stieber – D.C. United – 2017–19
István Urbányi – San Jose – 1997–98

Iceland 
Victor Pálsson – New York Red Bulls, D.C. United – 2012, 2022–
Kristinn Steindórsson – Columbus – 2015
Guðmundur Þórarinsson – New York City FC – 2020–21
Dagur Dan Þórhallsson – Orlando – 2023–
Róbert Orri Þorkelsson – Montréal – 2022–
Arnór Ingvi Traustason – New England – 2021–22
Thorleifur Úlfarsson – Houston – 2022–

Israel 
Orr Barouch – Chicago – 2011–12
Omer Damari – New York Red Bulls – 2016
Dedi Ben Dayan – Colorado – 2005–06
Gadi Kinda – Kansas City – 2020–21
Guy Melamed – Colorado – 2005

Italy 
Federico Bernardeschi – Toronto – 2022–
Nicola Caricola – MetroStars – 1996
Giorgio Chiellini – Los Angeles – 2022–
Gabriele Corbo – Montréal – 2022
Bernardo Corradi – Montreal – 2012
Domenico Criscito – Toronto – 2022
Carlo Cudicini – LA Galaxy – 2013
Marco Di Vaio – Montreal – 2012–14
Marco Donadel – Montreal – 2015–18
Roberto Donadoni – MetroStars – 1996–97
Matteo Ferrari – Montreal – 2012–14
Giuseppe Galderisi – New England, Tampa Bay – 1996–97
Sebastian Giovinco – Toronto – 2015–18
Lorenzo Insigne – Toronto – 2022–
Matteo Mancosu – Montreal – 2016–18
Vito Mannone – Minnesota – 2019
José Mauri – Kansas City – 2021–22
Alessandro Nesta – Montreal – 2012–13
Antonio Nocerino – Orlando – 2016–17
Daniele Paponi – Montreal – 2013
Raoul Petretta – Toronto – 2023–
Andrea Pirlo – New York City FC – 2015–17
Andrea Pisanu – Montreal – 2013
Giuseppe Rossi – Salt Lake – 2020
Paolo Tornaghi – Chicago, Vancouver – 2012–13, 2016–17
Walter Zenga – New England – 1997, 1999

Latvia 
Raivis Hščanovičs – Toronto – 2010

Liechtenstein 
Nicolas Hasler – Toronto, Chicago, Kansas City – 2017–19

Lithuania 
Vytautas Andriuškevičius – Portland, D.C. United – 2016–18
Edgaras Jankauskas – New England – 2009–10

Luxembourg 
Maxime Chanot – New York City FC – 2016–

Malta 
Etienne Barbara – Vancouver – 2012

Montenegro 
Mersim Beskovic – MetroStars – 2001
Branko Bošković – D.C. United – 2010–12
Emrah Klimenta – LA Galaxy – 2018
Nikola Vujnović – Kansas City – 2022
Nemanja Vuković – Columbus – 2012

Netherlands 
Alexander Büttner – New England – 2020
Geoffrey Castillion – New England – 2014
Nigel de Jong – LA Galaxy – 2016
Siem de Jong – Cincinnati – 2020
Michael de Leeuw – Chicago – 2016–18
Raimo de Vries – Colorado – 1996
Rachid El Khalifi – Salt Lake – 2009
John Goossens – Chicago – 2016–18
Edwin Gorter – New England, Miami Fusion – 1998–99
Richard Goulooze – New England – 1998–99
Danny Hoesen – San Jose, Austin – 2017–22
Collins John – Chicago – 2010
Johan Kappelhof – Chicago, Salt Lake – 2016–22
Danny Koevermans – Toronto – 2011–13
Kai Koreniuk – LA Galaxy – 2020
Jürgen Locadia – Cincinnati – 2020–21
Sherjill MacDonald – Chicago – 2012–13
Nick Marsman – Inter Miami – 2021–
Maarten Paes – Dallas – 2022–
Nigel Robertha – D.C. United – 2021–
Victor Sikora – Dallas – 2008
Nick Soolsma – Toronto – 2011–12
Pele van Anholt – LA Galaxy – 2017–18
Dave van den Bergh – Kansas City, New York Red Bulls, Dallas – 2006–09
Silvester van der Water – Orlando – 2021–22
Maikel van der Werff – Cincinnati – 2019–20
Gregory van der Wiel – Toronto – 2018
Kenneth Vermeer – Los Angeles FC, Cincinnati – 2020–21
Ronald Waterreus – New York Red Bulls – 2007
Giliano Wijnaldum – Philadelphia – 2017
Vito Wormgoor – Columbus – 2020–21

Northern Ireland 
Steve Morrow – Dallas – 2002–03
Martin Paterson – Orlando – 2015
Jonny Steele – Salt Lake, New York Red Bulls – 2012–14
Mark Williams – Columbus – 2003

Norway 
Øyvind Alseth – Toronto – 2017
Jo Inge Berget – New York City FC – 2018
Vadim Demidov – Minnesota – 2017
Adama Diomande – Los Angeles FC, Toronto – 2018–20, 2023–
Magnus Wolff Eikrem – Seattle – 2018
Ruben Gabrielsen – Austin – 2022
Jakob Glesnes – Philadelphia – 2020–
Fredrik Gulbrandsen – New York Red Bulls – 2017
Eirik Johansen – New York City FC – 2015–17
Bjørn Maars Johnsen – Montreal – 2021
Pa-Modou Kah – Portland, Vancouver – 2013–16]]
Ola Kamara – Columbus, LA Galaxy, D.C. United  – 2016–22
Muhamed Keita – New York Red Bulls – 2017–18
Nicolai Næss – Columbus – 2016–17
Sigurd Rosted – Toronto – 2023–
Jørgen Skjelvik – LA Galaxy – 2018–19
Jan Gunnar Solli – New York Red Bulls – 2011–12

Poland 
Adam Buksa – New England – 2020–22
Przemysław Frankowski – Chicago – 2019–21
Tomasz Frankowski – Chicago – 2008
Kamil Jóźwiak – Charlotte – 2022–
Andrzej Juskowiak – MetroStars – 2003
Mateusz Klich – D.C. United – 2023–
Patryk Klimala – New York Red Bulls – 2021–22
Roman Kosecki – Chicago – 1998–99
Wojtek Krakowiak – San Jose, Tampa Bay – 2000–01
Krzysztof Król – Chicago, Montreal – 2010, 2014
Jarosław Niezgoda – Portland – 2020–
Piotr Nowak – Chicago – 1998–2002
Damien Perquis – Toronto – 2015–16
Jerzy Podbrożny – Chicago – 1998–99
Kacper Przybyłko – Philadelphia, Chicago – 2019–
Miroslaw Rzepa – Columbus – 2000
Jan Sobociński – Charlotte – 2022–
Karol Świderski – Charlotte – 2022–
Przemysław Tytoń – Cincinnati – 2019–21
Konrad Warzycha – Kansas City, Columbus – 2012–13
Robert Warzycha – Columbus – 1996–2002
Jacek Ziober – Tampa Bay – 1998

Portugal 
Nuno André Coelho – Kansas City – 2016
Yannick Djaló – San Jose – 2014
José Gonçalves – New England – 2013–16
André Horta – Los Angeles FC – 2018–19
Luís Martins – Kansas City, Vancouver – 2019–
João Meira – Chicago – 2016–17
João Moutinho – Los Angeles FC, Orlando – 2018–22
Nani – Orlando – 2019–21
João Pedro – LA Galaxy – 2017–18
Rafael Ramos – Orlando, Chicago – 2015–18
Paulo Renato – San Jose – 2015
Nuno Santos – Charlotte – 2022–
Pedro Santos – Columbus, D.C. United – 2017–
Carlos Semedo – New England – 2002
David Viana – Salt Lake – 2012
Abel Xavier – LA Galaxy – 2007–08

Republic of Ireland 
Richie Baker – New England – 2004
Bryan Byrne – New England – 2007
Kevin Doyle – Colorado – 2015–17
Danny Earls – Colorado – 2010–11
Caleb Folan – Colorado – 2011
Jon Gallagher – Atlanta, Austin – 2020–
Ian Hennessy – MetroStars – 1996
Robbie Keane – LA Galaxy – 2011–16
Paul Keegan – New England – 1996–2000
Joe Mason – Colorado – 2018
Chris McCann – Atlanta, D.C. United – 2017–19
Quinn McNeill – Charlotte – 2022
Jake Mulraney – Atlanta, Orlando – 2020–22
Andy O'Brien – Vancouver – 2012–14
Ronnie O'Brien – Dallas, Toronto, San Jose – 2002–08
Darren O'Dea – Toronto – 2012–13
Connor Ronan – Colorado – 2023–
Sean St Ledger – Orlando, Colorado – 2015
Derrick Williams – LA Galaxy, D.C. United – 2021–

Romania 
Deian Boldor – Montreal – 2017
Andreas Ivan – New York Red Bulls – 2018–19
Răzvan Cociș – Chicago – 2014–16
Alexandru Mățan – Columbus – 2021–
Alexandru Mitriță – New York City FC – 2019–20
Alex Zotincă – Kansas City, Chivas USA – 2003–08, 2010

Russia 
Rod Dyachenko – D.C. United – 2006–08
Sergei Raad – Kansas City – 2006
Igor Simutenkov – Kansas City – 2002–04
Maxim Usanov – Toronto – 2010

Scotland 
Kris Boyd – Portland – 2012
Chris Cadden – Columbus – 2020
Steven Caldwell – Toronto – 2013–15
Peter Canero – New York Red Bulls – 2006
Jamie Clark – San Jose – 1999–2000
Paul Dalglish – Houston – 2006–07
Kenny Deuchar – Salt Lake – 2008
Stuart Findlay – Philadelphia – 2021–22
Tony Gallacher – Toronto – 2020
Ryan Gauld – Vancouver – 2021–
Richard Gough – Kansas City, San Jose – 1997–98
Mo Johnston – Kansas City – 1996–2001
Gary Mackay-Steven – New York City FC – 2019–20
Calum Mallace – Montreal, Los Angeles FC – 2012–18
Shaun Maloney – Chicago – 2015
Tam McManus – Colorado – 2008
Kenny Miller – Vancouver – 2012–14
Adam Moffat – Columbus, Portland, Houston, Seattle, Dallas – 2007–14
Lewis Morgan – Inter Miami, New York Red Bulls – 2020–
Sam Nicholson – Minnesota, Colorado – 2017–20, 2022–
Barry Robson – Vancouver – 2012
Johnny Russell – Kansas City – 2018–
Jamie Smith – Colorado – 2009–13
Steven Smith – Portland – 2012
Kevin Souter  – Kansas City – 2009–10
John Spencer – Colorado – 2001–04
Danny Wilson – Colorado – 2018–

Serbia 
Saša Ćurčić – MetroStars – 1999
Dejan Joveljić – LA Galaxy – 2021–
Aleksandar Katai – Chicago, LA Galaxy – 2018–20
Miloš Kocić – D.C. United, Toronto, Portland – 2009–13
Alen Kozić – Miami Fusion – 1998–99
Neven Marković – Kansas City – 2012
Veljko Paunović – Philadelphia – 2011
Marko Perović – New England – 2010–11
Đorđe Petrović – New England – 2022–
Ivan Polic – LA Galaxy – 2000
Nemanja Radoja – Kansas City – 2023–
Vuk Rašović – Kansas City – 2004
Bratislav Ristić – Chicago – 2010–11
Dejan Rusmir – Columbus – 2011
Bojan Stepanović – Chivas USA – 2009
Alen Stevanović – Toronto – 2011
Luka Stojanović – Chicago – 2020–21
Miloš Stojčev – Kansas City – 2011
Ilija Stolica – New England – 2010–11
Ranko Veselinović – Vancouver – 2020–
Bojan Vučković – New England – 1996

Slovakia 
Ján Greguš – Minnesota, San Jose – 2019–22
Adam Nemec – New York City FC – 2015
Ľubomír Reiter – Chicago – 2005
Albert Rusnák – Salt Lake, Seattle – 2017–
Boris Sekulić – Chicago – 2020–22

Slovenia 
Robert Berić – Chicago – 2020–21
Antonio Delamea Mlinar – New England – 2017–20
Mitja Ilenič – New York City FC – 2023–
Aljaž Ivačič – Portland – 2020–
Žan Kolmanič – Austin – 2021–
Aljaž Struna – Houston, Montreal – 2019–21
Andraž Struna – New York City FC – 2017

Spain 
Agus – Houston – 2016
Ager Aketxe – Toronto – 2018
Pablo Álvarez – New York City FC – 2015
Eloi Amagat – New York City FC – 2018
Angeliño – New York City FC – 2015
Armando – New York Red Bulls – 2014
Jon Bakero – Chicago, Toronto – 2018
Miguel Berry – Columbus, D.C. United, Atlanta – 2021–
Ruben Bover – New York Red Bulls – 2013–14
Albert Celades – New York Red Bulls – 2009
Christian – D.C. United – 2014
Jon Erice – Vancouver – 2019
Andreu Fontàs – Kansas City – 2018–
Dani Fragoso – Chivas USA – 2014
Carles Gil – New England – 2019–
Nacho Gil – New England – 2022–
Ilie – Kansas City, Los Angeles FC – 2017–
Andoni Iraola – New York City FC – 2015–16
Jesús Jiménez – Toronto – 2022– 
Aitor Karanka – Colorado – 2006
Koke – Houston – 2011
Bojan Krkić – Montreal – 2019–20
Gorka Larrea – Montreal – 2014
Cristian Lobato – Kansas City – 2017–18
Ignacio Maganto – LA Galaxy – 2015
José Mari – Colorado – 2014
José Martínez – Dallas – 2021–
David Mateos – Orlando – 2015–16
Álvaro Medrán – Chicago – 2020–21
Mista – Toronto – 2010
José Luis Morales – New England – 2000
Alfredo Ortuño – Salt Lake – 2018
Sergi Palencia – Los Angeles FC – 2023–
Javier Pérez – Los Angeles FC – 2019
Víctor Pérez – Chicago – 2015
Alejandro Pozuelo – Toronto, Inter Miami – 2019–22
Riqui Puig – LA Galaxy – 2022–
Jordi Quintillà – Kansas City – 2015–16
Álvaro Rey – Toronto, Columbus – 2013–14
David Rocha – Houston – 2016
Raúl Rodríguez – Houston – 2015–16
Víctor Rodríguez – Seattle – 2017–19
Oriol Rosell – Kansas City, Orlando, LA Galaxy – 2012–14, 2018–
Sergio Ruiz – Charlotte – 2022
Cristian Tello – Los Angeles FC – 2022
Toni – Kansas City – 2014
Carlos Varela – D.C. United – 2010
Víctor Vázquez – Toronto, LA Galaxy – 2017–18, 2021–22
David Villa – New York City FC – 2015–18

Sweden 
Oskar Ågren – San Jose – 2022–
Rasmus Alm – St. Louis – 2023–
John Alvbåge – Minnesota – 2017
Samuel Armenteros – Portland – 2018
Johan Blomberg – Colorado – 2018–19
Jan Eriksson – Tampa Bay – 1998–99
Magnus Eriksson – San Jose – 2018–20
Erik Friberg – Seattle – 2011, 2015–16
Markus Holgersson – New York Red Bulls – 2012–13
Zlatan Ibrahimović – LA Galaxy – 2018–19
Stefan Ishizaki – LA Galaxy – 2014–15
Robin Jansson – Orlando – 2019–
Adam Johansson – Seattle – 2012
Anders Limpar – Colorado – 1999–2000
Freddie Ljungberg – Seattle, Chicago – 2009–10
Adam Lundqvist – Houston, Austin – 2018–
Christopher McVey – Inter Miami – 2022–
Tom Pettersson – Cincinnati – 2020–21
Joel Qwiberg – San Jose – 2018
Thomas Ravelli – Tampa Bay – 1998
Björn Runström – New England – 2012
Axel Sjöberg – Colorado, D.C. United – 2015–20
Gustav Svensson – Seattle – 2017–20
Anton Tinnerholm – New York City FC – 2018–22
Christian Wilhelmsson – LA Galaxy – 2012

Switzerland 
François Affolter – San Jose – 2017–19
Tranquillo Barnetta – Philadelphia – 2015–16
Leonardo Bertone – Cincinnati – 2019
Roman Bürki – St. Louis – 2023–
Davide Chiumiento – Vancouver – 2011–12
Blerim Džemaili – Montreal – 2017
Jonas Elmer – Toronto – 2013
Innocent Emeghara – San Jose – 2015–16
Stefan Frei – Toronto, Seattle – 2009–11, 2013–
Maren Haile-Selassie – Chicago – 2023–
Dennis Iapichino – Montreal, D.C. United – 2012–13
Chris Kablan – Salt Lake – 2022
Blaise Nkufo – Seattle – 2010
Alain Rochat – Vancouver, D.C. United – 2011–13
Philippe Senderos – Houston – 2017–18
Xherdan Shaqiri – Chicago – 2022–
Alain Sutter – Dallas – 1997–98
Scott Sutter – Orlando, Vancouver – 2017–19
Jérôme Thiesson – Minnesota – 2017–18
Raphaël Wicky – Chivas USA – 2008
Adrian Winter – Orlando – 2015–16
Reto Ziegler – Dallas – 2018–20

Turkey 
Sercan Güvenışık – San Jose – 2012

Ukraine 
Sergi Daniv – Dallas, Chicago – 1999–2002
Ihor Dotsenko – Kansas City – 2000
Aleksey Korol – Dallas, Chicago – 2000–02
Dema Kovalenko – Chicago, D.C. United, New York Red Bulls, Salt Lake, LA Galaxy – 1999–2010
Serhiy Kryvtsov – Inter Miami – 2023–
Yuri Lavrinenko – Chicago – 2000

Wales 
Gareth Bale – Los Angeles FC – 2022
Andy Dorman – New England – 2004–07, 2013–15
Robert Earnshaw – Toronto, Chicago, Vancouver – 2013–15
Adam Henley – Salt Lake – 2018
Carl Robinson – Toronto, New York Red Bulls – 2007–11

North and Central America, Caribbean (CONCACAF)

Belize 
 Tony Rocha – Orlando, New York City FC – 2016–21
Michael Salazar – Montreal, Houston – 2016–17, 2019–20

Bermuda 
Freddy Hall – Toronto – 2012
Reggie Lambe – Toronto – 2012–13
Khano Smith – New England, New York Red Bulls – 2005–10

Costa Rica 
Jairo Arrieta – Columbus, D.C. United – 2012–15
Gabriel Badilla – New England – 2008
Christian Bolaños – Vancouver – 2016–17
Jonathan Bolaños – Chicago – 2003
Pablo Brenes – MetroStars – 2004
Keyner Brown – Houston – 2016
Francisco Calvo – Minnesota, Chicago, San Jose – 2017–22
Diego Campos – Chicago – 2018–19
Julio Cascante – Portland, Austin – 2018–
Dennis Castillo – Colorado – 2016–17
Pablo Chinchilla – LA Galaxy – 2005
Allan Cruz – Cincinnati – 2019–22
Darío Delgado – Chivas USA – 2010
Luis Díaz – Columbus – 2019–
Argenis Fernández – New England – 2008
Waylon Francis – Columbus, Seattle – 2014–21
Giancarlo González – Columbus, LA Galaxy – 2014, 2019–20
Leonardo González – Seattle – 2009–15
David Guzmán – Portland, Columbus – 2017–19
Denis Hamlett – Colorado – 1996
Andy Herron – Chicago, Columbus – 2004–08
Carlos Johnson – New York Red Bulls – 2009
Ariel Lassiter – LA Galaxy, Houston, Inter Miami – 2015–18, 2020–
Randall Leal – Nashville – 2020–
José Leitón – Minnesota – 2017
Porfirio López – Philadelphia – 2012
Marvin Loría – Portland – 2019–
José Macotelo – Chivas USA – 2010
Josué Martínez – Philadelphia, New York Red Bulls – 2012–13
Rónald Matarrita – New York City FC, Cincinnati – 2016–22
Roy Miller – New York Red Bulls, Portland – 2010–15, 2017–18
Joseph Mora – D.C. United, Charlotte – 2018–
Kurt Morsink – Kansas City, D.C. United – 2007–11
Roy Myers – MetroStars, LA Galaxy – 1999–2001
David Myrie – Philadelphia – 2010
José Guillermo Ortiz – D.C. United – 2017
Bryan Oviedo – Salt Lake – 2022–
Álvaro Saborío – Salt Lake, D.C. United – 2010–16
Álvaro Sánchez – Dallas – 2009
Erick Scott – Columbus – 2004
Gonzalo Segares – Chicago – 2005–14
Ulises Segura – D.C. United – 2018–20
Alejandro Sequeira – Tampa Bay, San Jose – 1998
Douglas Sequeira – Chivas USA, Salt Lake – 2005–06
Jordan Smith – Vancouver – 2015–16
Mauricio Solís – San Jose – 1999–2000
Jafet Soto – Salt Lake – 2006
William Sunsing – New England – 2000–01
Daniel Torres – Columbus, Salt Lake, Dallas – 2001–03, 2006–07, 2009
Michael Umaña – LA Galaxy, Chivas USA – 2005, 2010–11
Marco Ureña – San Jose, Los Angeles FC – 2017–18
Olman Vargas – Columbus – 2012
Johan Venegas – Montreal, Minnesota – 2015–17
Rodney Wallace – D.C. United, Portland, New York City FC, Kansas City – 2009–15, 2017–19
Paulo Wanchope – Chicago – 2007
Kendall Waston – Vancouver, Cincinnati – 2014–20
Mauricio Wright – San Jose, New England – 1999–2001

Cuba 
Osvaldo Alonso – Seattle, Minnesota, Atlanta– 2009–
Yordany Álvarez – Salt Lake – 2011–13
Maikel Chang – Salt Lake – 2020–
Jorge Corrales – Chicago, Montreal – 2018–20
Alberto Delgado – Colorado – 2004
Maykel Galindo – Chivas USA, Dallas – 2007–11
Rey Ángel Martínez – Colorado – 2004
Eduardo Sebrango – Montreal – 2012

Curaçao 
Javier Martina – Toronto – 2011
Eloy Room – Columbus – 2019–

Dominican Republic 
Edison Azcona – Inter Miami – 2021–

El Salvador 
Jaime Alas – San Jose – 2013
Arturo Álvarez – San Jose, Dallas, Salt Lake, Chicago, Houston – 2003–11, 2016–18
Junior Burgos – Toronto – 2012
Eric Calvillo – San Jose – 2018–20
Christian Castillo – D.C. United – 2010
Darwin Cerén – Orlando, San Jose, Houston – 2015–22
Ronald Cerritos – San Jose, Dallas, D.C. United, Houston – 1997–2006
Mauricio Cienfuegos – LA Galaxy – 1996–2003
Raúl Díaz Arce – D.C. United, New England, San Jose, Tampa Bay, Colorado – 1996–2001
Andrés Flores – Portland – 2018–20
Marvin Iraheta – Chivas USA – 2013
Julio Martínez – Chicago – 2010
Gerson Mayen – Chivas USA – 2009–11
Amando Moreno – New York Red Bulls, Chicago – 2013, 2019
Alfredo Pacheco – New York Red Bulls – 2009
Joshua Pérez – Los Angeles FC – 2018–19
Steve Purdy – Dallas, Portland, Chivas USA – 2009, 2011–13
Marvin Quijano – LA Galaxy, Colorado – 1999–2002
Eliseo Quintanilla – D.C. United – 2002–03
Jorge Rodríguez – Dallas – 1997–2002
Alex Roldan – Seattle – 2018–
Osael Romero – Chivas USA – 2010
Tomas Romero – Los Angeles FC – 2021
Ramón Sánchez – San Jose – 2009–10
Deris Umanzor – Chicago – 2010
Eriq Zavaleta – Seattle, Chivas USA, Toronto, LA Galaxy – 2013–
Rodolfo Zelaya – Los Angeles FC – 2019

Grenada 
Kharlton Belmar – Kansas City – 2017–2018
Shalrie Joseph – New England, Chivas USA, Seattle – 2003–13
Craig Rocastle – Kansas City – 2010–11

Guadeloupe 
Stéphane Auvray – Kansas City, New York Red Bulls – 2010–11
Miguel Comminges – Colorado – 2011
Eddy Viator – Toronto – 2011
Ronald Zubar – New York Red Bulls – 2015–16

Guatemala 
Gustavo Cabrera – Salt Lake – 2005
Freddy García – Columbus – 2002–03
Moises Hernandez – Dallas – 2014–15
Martín Machón – LA Galaxy, Miami Fusion – 1997–98, 2000
Arquimides Ordonez – Cincinnati – 2021–
Marco Pappa – Chicago, Seattle, Colorado – 2008–12, 2014–16
Guillermo Ramírez – LA Galaxy – 2005
Jorge Rodas – San Jose – 1996
Mario Rodríguez – Columbus – 2005
Rubio Rubin – Salt Lake – 2021–
Carlos Ruiz – LA Galaxy, Dallas, Toronto, Philadelphia, D.C. United – 2002–08, 2011, 2013, 2016
Rodrigo Saravia – Columbus – 2016
Willie Sims – New England – 2006
Jonathan Top – Dallas – 2012
Elías Vásquez – Salt Lake – 2015

Guyana 
Warren Creavalle – Houston, Toronto, Philadelphia – 2012–20
Gregory Richardson – Colorado – 2009
J. P. Rodrigues – D.C. United – 2010
Emery Welshman – Toronto – 2013

Haiti 
Jean Alexandre – Salt Lake, San Jose – 2009–12
Shanyder Borgelin – Inter Miami – 2023–
Alexandre Boucicaut – Chicago – 2004
Steward Ceus – Colorado – 2012–13
Derrick Etienne – New York Red Bulls, Cincinnati, Columbus, Atlanta – 2016–
Lesly Fellinga – Toronto – 2009
Zachary Herivaux – New England – 2016, 2018
Andrew Jean-Baptiste – Portland, Chivas USA – 2012–14
Mechack Jérôme – Kansas City – 2013–14
Peterson Joseph – Kansas City – 2011–13
Jerrod Laventure – New York Red Bulls – 2006–07
James Marcelin – Portland, Dallas – 2011–12
Josué Mayard – Dallas – 2001–02
Soni Mustivar – Kansas City – 2015–17
Fabrice Noël – Colorado – 2005–06
Peguero Jean Philippe – Colorado, New York Red Bulls, San Jose – 2004–06, 2008
Brian Sylvestre – Philadelphia – 2015
Patrick Tardieu – New England – 1996
Sebastien Vorbe – LA Galaxy – 2000

Honduras 
Bryan Acosta – Dallas, Colorado – 2019–
Danilo Acosta – Salt Lake, Orlando, LA Galaxy– 2017–19, 2021
Éver Alvarado – Kansas City – 2016
Kervin Arriaga – Minnesota – 2022–
Brayan Beckeles – Nashville – 2020
Jerry Bengtson – New England – 2012–14
Víctor Bernárdez – San Jose – 2012–17
Samuel Caballero – Chicago – 2005
Mauricio Castro – New England – 2008–09
Marvin Chávez – Dallas, San Jose, Colorado, Chivas USA – 2009–14
Michaell Chirinos – Vancouver – 2019
Jorge Claros – Kansas City – 2014
Carlo Costly – Houston – 2011
Arnold Cruz – D.C. United, San Jose – 1997–98
Alberth Elis – Houston – 2017–20
José Escalante – Houston – 2016–17
Roger Espinoza – Kansas City – 2008–12, 2015–
Maynor Figueroa – Colorado, Dallas, Houston – 2015–21
Deybi Flores – Vancouver – 2015–16
Boniek García – Houston – 2012–21
Luis Garrido – Houston – 2014–15
Iván Guerrero – Chicago, San Jose, D.C. United – 2005–08
Amado Guevara – New York Red Bulls, Chivas USA, Toronto – 2003–09
Johnny Leverón – Vancouver – 2013–14
Alexander López – Houston – 2013–15
Luis López Fernández – Los Angeles FC – 2018
Denil Maldonado – Los Angeles FC – 2023–
Douglas Martínez – Salt Lake – 2019–21
Mario Martínez – Seattle – 2012–13
Saúl Martínez – Miami Fusion – 1999
Walter Martínez – San Jose – 2013
Andy Najar – D.C. United, Los Angeles FC – 2010–12, 2020–
Ramón Núñez – Dallas, Chivas USA – 2004–07, 2013
Carlos Pavón – LA Galaxy – 2007
Alex Pineda Chacón – Miami Fusion, New England, LA Galaxy, Columbus – 2001–03
Romell Quioto – Houston, Montreal – 2017–
Milton Reyes – D.C. United, Dallas – 2002, 2004
Bryan Róchez – Orlando – 2015
Joseph Rosales – Minnesota – 2021–
Hendry Thomas – Colorado, Dallas – 2012–14

Jamaica 
Nicholas Addlery – D.C. United – 2007
Giles Barnes – Houston, Vancouver, Orlando – 2012–17
Andre Blake – Philadelphia – 2014–
Neco Brett – Portland – 2016
Brian Brown – Philadelphia – 2014
Deshorn Brown – Colorado, D.C. United – 2013–15, 2017
Javain Brown – Vancouver – 2021–
Cory Burke – Philadelphia, New York Red Bulls – 2018–
Altimont Butler – San Jose, Columbus – 1996–97
Sergio Campbell – Columbus – 2015
Omar Cummings – Colorado, Houston – 2007–14
Rashawn Dally – Cincinnati – 2019–20
Chris Dawes – Colorado – 2001
Simon Dawkins – San Jose – 2011–12, 2016–17
Stephen DeRoux – D.C. United – 2006–07
Joey DeZart – Orlando – 2020–22
Oniel Fisher – Seattle, D.C. United, LA Galaxy, Minnesota – 2015–22
Shaun Francis – Columbus, Chicago, San Jose, Montreal – 2010–17
Brenton Griffiths – Colorado – 2013
Winston Griffiths – MetroStars, LA Galaxy, New England – 2002
Wolde Harris – Colorado, New England, Kansas City, Colorado – 1997–03, 2005
Omar Holness – Salt Lake – 2016–17
Jermaine Hue – Kansas City – 2005–06
Jason Johnson – Houston, Chicago – 2013–15
Ryan Johnson – Salt Lake, Chicago, San Jose, Toronto, Portland – 2006, 2008–13
Dane Kelly – D.C. United – 2018
Kemar Lawrence – New York Red Bulls, Toronto, Minnesota United – 2015–19, 2021–
Damion Lowe – Inter Miami – 2022–
Onandi Lowe – Kansas City – 2001
Tyrone Marshall – Colorado, Miami Fusion, LA Galaxy, Toronto, Seattle – 1998–2012
Darren Mattocks – Vancouver, Portland, D.C. United, Cincinnati – 2012–19
Justin McMaster – Minnesota – 2021
Ravel Morrison – D.C. United – 2022–
Lovel Palmer – Houston, Portland, Salt Lake, Chicago – 2010–15
Demar Phillips – Salt Lake – 2015–18
Alvas Powell – Portland, Cincinnati, Inter Miami, Philadelphia – 2013–
Darryl Powell – Colorado – 2003–04
Damani Ralph – Chicago – 2003–04
Dane Richards – New York Red Bulls, Vancouver – 2007–12, 2015
Donovan Ricketts – LA Galaxy, Montreal, Portland, Orlando – 2009–15
Robert Scarlett – Salt Lake – 2005
Michael Seaton – D.C. United – 2013–14
Greg Simmonds – Miami Fusion – 2001
Khari Stephenson – Kansas City, San Jose, Salt Lake – 2004–05, 2010–15
Fabian Taylor – MetroStars – 2004
Jermaine Taylor – Houston, Portland, Minnesota – 2011–17
Roger Thomas – Miami Fusion – 1998
Shavar Thomas – Dallas, Kansas City, Chivas USA, Philadelphia, Montreal – 2003–12
Peter-Lee Vassell – Los Angeles FC – 2019
Je-Vaughn Watson – Houston, Dallas, New England – 2011–17
O'Brian White – Toronto, Seattle – 2009–11
Andy Williams – Columbus, Miami Fusion, New England, MetroStars, Chicago, Salt Lake – 1998–2011
Dicoy Williams – Toronto – 2011–12
Romario Williams – Montreal, Atlanta, Columbus – 2015, 2018–19
Paul Young – Columbus, Tampa Bay – 1996, 1998
Craig Ziadie – D.C. United, MetroStars – 2001–04

Martinique 
Jordy Delem – Seattle – 2017–21
Harry Novillo – Montreal – 2019
Frédéric Piquionne – Portland – 2013–14

Mexico 
José Manuel Abundis – New England – 2006
Miguel Aguilar – D.C. United – 2015–16
Oswaldo Alanís – San Jose – 2020–21
Tony Alfaro – Seattle, D.C. United – 2016–18, 2021–22
Cesar Alvarado – Tampa Bay – 1999
Byron Alvarez – MetroStars – 2002
Damián Álvarez – Dallas, New England – 1997–98
Efraín Álvarez – LA Galaxy – 2019–
Uriel Antuna – LA Galaxy – 2019
Julián Araujo – LA Galaxy – 2019–22
Rafael Baca – San Jose – 2011–13
Adolfo Bautista – Chivas USA – 2014
Armando Begines – Chivas USA – 2005
Cuauhtémoc Blanco – Chicago – 2007–09
Omar Bravo – Kansas City – 2011
Jorge Campos – LA Galaxy, Chicago – 1996–98
Giovani Casillas – Chivas USA – 2013
Jorge Castañeda – Colorado – 1997
Nery Castillo – Chicago – 2010
Ronaldo Cisneros – Atlanta – 2022
Héctor Cuadros – Chivas USA – 2005
Jürgen Damm – Atlanta – 2020–21
Duilio Davino – Dallas – 2008
Antonio de la Torre – Colorado – 2004
Mario de Luna – Chivas USA – 2013
Giovani dos Santos – LA Galaxy – 2015–18
Jonathan dos Santos – LA Galaxy – 2017–21
Missael Espinoza – San Jose – 1996
Rodolfo Espinoza – Chivas USA – 2010
Marco Fabián – Philadelphia – 2019
Carlos Fierro – San Jose – 2019–21
Vicente Figueroa – San Jose, Kansas City – 1998–2000
Guillermo Franco – Chicago – 2012
Johnny García – Chivas USA – 2006
Juan Pablo García – Chivas USA – 2005–06
Sergio García – Chivas USA – 2005
Jonathan González – Minnesota – 2022
Raúl Gudiño – Atlanta – 2022
Aaron Guillen – Dallas – 2016–17
Daniel Guzmán – San Jose – 1997
Carlos Hermosillo – LA Galaxy – 1996–97
Cristhian Hernández – Philadelphia – 2012
Javier Hernández – LA Galaxy – 2020–
José Hernández – Salt Lake – 2017–18
Luis Hernández – LA Galaxy – 2000–01
Héctor Herrera – Houston – 2022–
Diego Jiménez – New York Red Bulls – 2008
Efraín Juárez – Vancouver – 2018
Luis Ángel Landín – Houston – 2009–10
Bryan Leyva – Dallas – 2010, 2012
Eduardo Lillingston – Chivas USA – 2009
Alfonso Loera – Chivas USA – 2005
Aaron López – Chivas USA – 2005
Javier Eduardo López – San Jose – 2021–22
Rubén Luna – Dallas – 2010–12
Rafael Márquez – New York Red Bulls – 2010–12
Antonio Martínez – Dallas, LA Galaxy, Chivas USA – 2000–03, 2005
Édgar Mejía – Chivas USA – 2013
Raúl Mendiola – LA Galaxy – 2014, 2016–17
Francisco Mendoza – Chivas USA – 2005–08, 2011
Jesús Morales – Chivas USA – 2006
David Ochoa – Salt Lake, D.C. United – 2020–22
Jesús Ochoa – LA Galaxy, Chivas USA – 2002–03, 2005
Jaziel Orozco – Salt Lake – 2022
Daniel Osorno – Colorado – 2007
Jesús Padilla – Chivas USA – 2009–10
Francisco Palencia – Chivas USA – 2005–06
Pável Pardo – Chicago – 2011–12
David Patiño – Colorado – 1997
Jonathan Perez – LA Galaxy – 2021–
Gonzalo Pineda – Seattle – 2014–15
Rodolfo Pizarro – Inter Miami – 2020–21, 2023–
Martín Ponce – Chivas USA – 2013
Alan Pulido – Kansas City – 2020–21
Juanjo Purata – Atlanta – 2022–
Ramón Ramírez – Chivas USA – 2005
José Retiz – LA Galaxy, Columbus – 2003, 2006
Daniel Ríos – Nashville, Charlotte – 2020–22
José Manuel Rivera – Chivas USA – 2013
Alberto Rizo – Colorado – 2003
Edmundo Rodriguez – MetroStars, Kansas City – 1996–97
Isaac Romo – Chivas USA – 2005
Carlos Salcedo – Salt Lake, Toronto – 2013–14, 2022
Hugo Sánchez – Dallas – 1996
Richard Sánchez – Chicago, Kansas City – 2017–18, 2020
Pablo Sisniega – Los Angeles FC, Charlotte – 2019–
Erasmo Solórzano – Chivas USA – 2007
Claudio Suárez – Chivas USA – 2006–09
Miguel Tapias – Minnesota – 2023–
Christian Torres – Los Angeles FC – 2020, 2022–
Erick Torres – Chivas USA, Houston, Atlanta – 2013–17, 2020–21
Jairo Torres – Chicago – 2022–
Danny Trejo – Los Angeles FC – 2022
Mariano Trujillo – Chivas USA – 2009–11
Víctor Ulloa – Dallas, Cincinnati, Inter Miami – 2011, 2014–
Francisco Uribe – San Jose – 1998
Josecarlos Van Rankin – Portland – 2021–22
Carlos Vela – Los Angeles FC – 2018–
Joaquín Velázquez – Chivas USA – 2013
Adrian Zendejas – Kansas City – 2019
Alex Zendejas – Dallas – 2015
Martín Zúñiga – Chivas USA – 2005

Panama 
Roberto Brown – Colorado – 2007
Omar Browne – Montreal – 2019
Miguel Camargo – New York City FC – 2017
Adalberto Carrasquilla – Houston – 2021–
Armando Cooper – Toronto – 2016–17
Harold Cummings – San Jose – 2018–19
Jorge Dely Valdés – Colorado – 1999–2000
Fidel Escobar – New York Red Bulls – 2017–18
Rolando Escobar – Dallas – 2015
Aníbal Godoy – San Jose, Nashville – 2015–
Gabriel Gómez – Philadelphia – 2012
Carlos Harvey – LA Galaxy – 2020–22
Adolfo Machado – Houston – 2017–18
Cristian Martínez – Columbus, Chicago – 2016–19
Michael Amir Murillo – New York Red Bulls – 2017–19
Roberto Nurse – Chivas USA – 2008
Jaime Penedo – LA Galaxy – 2013–15
Blas Pérez – Dallas, Vancouver – 2012–16
Ricardo Phillips – New England – 2005
Alberto Quintero – San Jose – 2016
Carlos Rodríguez – Dallas – 2012
Marcos Sánchez – D.C. United – 2013
Tony Taylor – New England, New York City FC – 2014–16
Luis Tejada – Salt Lake – 2007
Gabriel Torres – Colorado – 2013–15
Román Torres – Seattle, Inter Miami – 2015–20

Puerto Rico 
Isaac Angking – New England – 2018
Cristian Arrieta – Philadelphia – 2010
Shawn Barry – Salt Lake – 2018
Terry Boss – Seattle – 2010
Bill Gaudette – Columbus, LA Galaxy, New York Red Bulls – 2005–06, 2012
Jeremy Hall – New York Red Bulls, Portland, Dallas, Toronto, New England – 2009–15
Jason Hernandez – MetroStars, Chivas USA, San Jose, New York City FC, Toronto – 2005–18
Tom Lips – New England – 1996
Chris Megaloudis – New York Red Bulls – 2008
Manolo Sanchez – New York Red Bulls – 2015
Josh Saunders – LA Galaxy, Salt Lake, New York City FC – 2008–13, 2015–16
Zarek Valentin – Chivas USA, Montreal, Portland, Houston, Minnesota – 2011–12, 2016–
Marco Vélez – Toronto – 2008–09
Petter Villegas – MetroStars, D.C. United – 1996, 1999–2002

Saint Kitts and Nevis 
Atiba Harris – Salt Lake, Chivas USA, Dallas, Vancouver, Colorado, San Jose – 2006–17

Saint Vincent and the Grenadines 
Oalex Anderson – Seattle – 2016
Ezra Hendrickson – MetroStars, LA Galaxy, Dallas, D.C. United, Chivas USA, Columbus – 1997–2008

Suriname 
Roland Alberg – Philadelphia – 2016–17
Kelvin Leerdam – Seattle, Inter Miami, LA Galaxy – 2017–

Trinidad and Tobago 
Kevin Adams – Columbus – 2001
Chris Birchall – LA Galaxy, Columbus – 2009–12
Cordell Cato – Seattle, San Jose – 2012–17
Daneil Cyrus – Kansas City, Chicago – 2011, 2015
Keon Daniel – Philadelphia – 2011–13
Aubrey David – Dallas – 2016
Craig Demmin – Tampa Bay – 2001
Ancil Elcock – Columbus – 1997–2001
Leslie Fitzpatrick – Salt Lake – 2005
Ajani Fortune – Atlanta – 2023–
Kevan George – Columbus – 2012–15
Gary Glasgow – Kansas City – 2000–02
Cornell Glen – MetroStars, Columbus, Colorado, LA Galaxy, San Jose – 2004–06, 2009–10
Brian Haynes – Dallas – 1996–2000
Shaka Hislop – Dallas – 2006–07
Justin Hoyte – Cincinnati – 2019
Julius James – Toronto, Houston, D.C. United, Columbus – 2008–12
Avery John – New England, D.C. United – 2004–07, 2009
Stern John – Columbus – 1998–99
Joevin Jones – Chicago, Seattle, Inter Miami – 2015–17, 2019–22
Kenwyne Jones – Atlanta – 2017
Darin Lewis – MetroStars – 2002
Yohance Marshall – LA Galaxy – 2010
Carlyle Mitchell – Vancouver – 2011–14
Kevin Molino – Orlando, Minnesota, Columbus – 2015–
Travis Mulraine – San Jose – 2000
David Nakhid – New England – 1998
Noah Powder – Salt Lake – 2021
Greg Ranjitsingh – Orlando, Minnesota – 2019–20
Marlon Rojas – Salt Lake – 2005
Collin Samuel – Toronto – 2007–08
Scott Sealy – Kansas City, San Jose, Dallas – 2005–08, 2010–12
Luke Singh – Toronto – 2021
Barry Swift – MetroStars – 1998
Osei Telesford – Chicago – 2007
Ryan Telfer – Toronto  – 2018–19
Keyeno Thomas – Colorado – 2000
Sheldon Thomas – LA Galaxy – 2000
Rick Titus – Colorado, Toronto – 2002, 2008
Mickey Trotman – Dallas, Miami Fusion – 1998–99
Nick Walker – Dallas – 2014
Mekeil Williams – Colorado – 2016–17
Evans Wise – Tampa Bay, New England – 1996–98

Turks and Caicos Islands 
Gavin Glinton – LA Galaxy, Dallas, San Jose – 2002–03, 2006–08

South America (CONMEBOL)

Argentina 
Luciano Abecasis – San Jose – 2021
Ramón Ábila – Minnesota, D.C. United – 2021
Luciano Acosta – D.C. United, Cincinnati – 2016–19, 2021–
Ignacio Aliseda – Chicago – 2020–21
Thiago Almada – Atlanta – 2022–
Favio Álvarez – LA Galaxy – 2019
Emiliano Amor – Kansas City – 2018
Adrián Arregui – Montreal – 2017
Yamil Asad – Atlanta, D.C. United – 2017–18, 2020–21, 2023–
David Ayala – Portland – 2022–
Mateo Bajamich – Houston – 2021
Esequiel Barco – Atlanta – 2018–21
Álvaro Barreal – Cincinnati – 2020–
Leandro Barrera – Chivas USA, San Jose – 2014–15
Guillermo Barros Schelotto – Columbus – 2007–10
Claudio Benetti – Dallas – 1999–2000
Hernán Bernardello – Montreal – 2013–14, 2016–17
Claudio Bieler – Kansas City – 2013–14
Sebastián Blanco – Portland – 2017–
Emiliano Bonfigli – Salt Lake – 2012
Martín Bonjour – Vancouver – 2012
Gustavo Bou – New England – 2019–
Claudio Bravo – Portland – 2021–
Federico Bravo – New York City FC – 2016
Víctor Cabrera – Montreal, Houston – 2015–20
Franco Caraccio – Houston – 2008
Milton Caraglio – New England – 2011
Julián Carranza – Inter Miami, Philadelphia – 2020–
Marcelo Carrera – Columbus – 1996–98
Valentín Castellanos – New York City FC – 2018–22
Emanuel Cecchini – Seattle – 2019
Ezequiel Cirigliano – Dallas – 2015
Eloy Colombano – Kansas City – 2007–08
Tomás Conechny – Portland – 2018–20
Enzo Copetti – Charlotte – 2023–
Matías Córdoba – Salt Lake – 2008
Facundo Coria – D.C. United – 2015
Franco Coria – New England – 2011
Eduardo Coudet – Philadelphia – 2010
Emil Cuello – LA Galaxy – 2019–20
Braian Cufré – New York City FC – 2023–
Cristian da Silva – MetroStars – 1996–98
Mauro Díaz – Dallas – 2013–18
Facundo Diz – Colorado – 2009
Eduardo Domínguez – LA Galaxy – 2008
Matías Donnet – D.C. United – 2006
Sebastián Driussi – Austin – 2021–
Emiliano Dudar – D.C. United – 2012
Ramiro Enrique – Orlando – 2023–
Facundo Erpen – D.C. United, Colorado – 2005–08
Luis Miguel Escalada – Salt Lake – 2009
Franco Escobar – Atlanta, Los Angeles FC, Houston – 2018–20, 2022–
Fabián Espíndola – Salt Lake, New York Red Bulls, D.C. United – 2007–16
Cristian Espinoza – San Jose – 2019–
Darío Fabbro – Kansas City, New England – 2002–03
Alejandro Farías – New England – 1997
Brian Fernández – Portland – 2019
Gastón Fernández – Portland – 2014–15
Nicolás Figal – Inter Miami – 2020–21
Lucio Filomeno – D.C. United – 2005–06
Juan Forchetti – MetroStars – 2003
Franco Fragapane – Minnesota – 2021–
Alan Franco – Atlanta – 2021–22
Nicolás Gaitán – Chicago – 2019
Marcelo Gallardo – D.C. United – 2008
Braian Galván – Colorado – 2020–
José Galván – MetroStars – 2003
Sergio Galván Rey – MetroStars – 2004–05
Walter García – New York Red Bulls – 2009
Érik Godoy – Vancouver – 2019–22
Christian Gómez – D.C. United, Colorado – 2004–09
Gastón González – Orlando – 2023–
Nelson González – Salt Lake – 2010–11
Leandro González Pírez – Atlanta, Inter Miami – 2017–21
Mario Gori – D.C. United, Miami Fusion, New England, Columbus – 1996–2000
Hernán Grana – Columbus, Dallas – 2015, 2017
Sebastián Grazzini – Chicago – 2011–12
Guillermo Hauche – New England – 2018
Nicolás Hernández – Colorado, Columbus – 2006–08
Marcelo Herrera – Miami Fusion – 1998
Federico Higuaín – Columbus, D.C. United, Inter Miami – 2012–21
Gonzalo Higuaín – Inter Miami – 2020–22
Santiago Hirsig – Kansas City – 2009–10
Franco Ibarra – Atlanta – 2021–
Andrés Imperiale – San Jose – 2016–17
Emiliano Insúa – LA Galaxy – 2020
Ricardo Iribarren – Columbus, Dallas – 1996, 1998, 2000
Sebastián Jaime – Salt Lake – 2014–15
Lucas Janson – Toronto – 2018
Agustin Jara – Dallas – 2016
Franco Jara – Dallas – 2020–22
Leonardo Jara – D.C. United – 2019
Matías Laba – Toronto, Vancouver – 2013–17
Carlos Ledesma – MetroStars – 1998
Emmanuel Ledesma – Cincinnati – 2019
Claudio López – Kansas City, Colorado – 2008–10
Lisandro López – Atlanta – 2021
Miguel López – LA Galaxy – 2011
Emanuel Maciel – Montreal – 2020–21
Cristian Maidana – Philadelphia, Houston – 2014–16
Matias Mantilla – Salt Lake – 2007–08
Carlos Marinelli – Kansas City – 2007–08
Diego Martínez – New York City FC – 2016
Pity Martínez – Atlanta – 2019–20
Juan Manuel Martínez – Salt Lake – 2015–16
Tomás Martínez – Houston – 2017–20
Emmanuel Mas – Orlando – 2021
Lucas Melano – Portland – 2015–16
Jonathan Menéndez – Salt Lake – 2021–22
Fernando Meza – Atlanta – 2020
Sergio Miguez – Columbus – 1997
Mariano Miño – Toronto – 2018
Leonel Miranda – Houston – 2015–16
Marcos Mondaini – Chivas USA – 2011
Javier Morales – Salt Lake, Dallas – 2007–17
Maximiliano Moralez – New York City FC – 2017–22
Marcelino Moreno – Atlanta – 2020–22
Federico Navarro – Chicago – 2021–
Beto Naveda – New England – 1996–97
Franco Negri – Inter Miami – 2023–
Franco Niell – D.C. United – 2008
Martín Ojeda – Orlando – 2023–
Lucas Ontivero – Montreal – 2016
Christian Ortiz – Charlotte – 2022
Rodrigo Pacheco – Los Angeles FC – 2018
Gino Padula – Columbus – 2008–10
Norberto Paparatto – Portland – 2014–15
Cristian Pavón – LA Galaxy – 2019–20
Daniel Peinado – Dallas – 1997
Matías Pellegrini – Inter Miami, New York City FC – 2020, 2022–
Agustín Pelletieri – Chivas USA – 2014
Gonzalo Peralta – D.C. United – 2008
Matías Pérez García – San Jose, Orlando – 2014–17
Ignacio Piatti – Montreal – 2014–19
Pablo Piatti – Toronto – 2020
Juan Pietravallo – New York Red Bulls – 2008–09
Lucas Pittinari – Colorado – 2015
Tomás Pochettino – Austin – 2021
Facundo Quignon – Dallas – 2021–
Juan Ramírez – Colorado – 2015
Eric Remedi – Atlanta, San Jose – 2018–22
Emanuel Reynoso – Minnesota – 2020–
Pablo Ricchetti – Dallas – 2007–09
Emiliano Rigoni – Austin – 2022–
Andrés Ríos – San Jose – 2019–21
Rocco Ríos Novo – Atlanta – 2022
Martín Rivero – Colorado, Chivas USA – 2012–14
Javier Robles – San Jose – 2010
Lucas Rodríguez – D.C. United – 2019
Andrés Romero – Montreal – 2013–15, 2017
Mauro Rosales – Seattle, Chivas USA, Vancouver, Dallas – 2011–17
Silvio Rudman – Columbus – 1997
Pablo Ruíz – Salt Lake – 2017–18, 2020–
Darío Sala – Dallas – 2005–10
Matías Sánchez – Columbus – 2013
Martin Šarić – Toronto – 2010
Gastón Sauro – Columbus – 2015–16, 2018–19
Rodrigo Schlegel – Orlando – 2020–
Luis Solignac – Colorado, Chicago – 2015–18
Diego Soñora – Dallas, MetroStars, D.C. United, Tampa Bay – 1996–99, 2001
Santiago Sosa – Atlanta – 2021–
Leonardo Squadrone – New England – 1997
Nicolás Stefanelli – Inter Miami – 2023–
Joaquín Torres – Montreal, Philadelphia – 2021–
Maximiliano Urruti – Toronto, Portland, Dallas, Montreal, Houston, Austin FC – 2013–
Milton Valenzuela – Columbus – 2018, 2020–21
Diego Valeri – Portland – 2013–21
Jorge Vázquez – New England – 2003
Daniel Vega – San Jose – 2019–21
Alan Velasco – Dallas – 2022–
Matías Vera – Houston – 2019–22
Gonzalo Verón – New York Red Bulls – 2015–17
Pablo Vitti – Toronto – 2009

Bolivia 
Pato Aguilera – Columbus, New England – 2000–01
Marco Etcheverry – D.C. United – 1996–2003
José Carlos Fernández – New England – 2001
Jefferson Gottardi – Tampa Bay – 1999
Cristhian Machado – New England – 2018
Bruno Miranda – D.C. United – 2017–18
Jaime Moreno – D.C. United, MetroStars – 1996–2010
Juan Manuel Peña – D.C. United – 2010
Jairo Quinteros – Inter Miami – 2022
Mauricio Ramos – Tampa Bay, New England – 1998–2000
Maurizio Rocha – Miami Fusion – 1999–2000
Sergio Salas – D.C. United – 2000
Berthy Suárez – D.C. United – 1996
Joselito Vaca – Dallas, MetroStars – 2001–04

Brazil 
Adaílton – Chicago – 2015
Adauto Neto – Dallas – 2002
Alex – Chicago, Houston – 2012–17
Alex Cazumba – LA Galaxy – 2010
Alexandre Pato – Orlando – 2021–22
Álvaro Pires – LA Galaxy – 2008
Anderson Conceição – Philadelphia – 2016
André Rocha – Dallas – 2008–09
Andre Shinyashiki – Colorado, Charlotte – 2019–
Antônio Carlos – Orlando – 2020–
Artur – Columbus, Houston – 2017–
Auro Jr. – Toronto – 2018–21
Branco – MetroStars – 1997
Brenner – Cincinnati – 2021–
Bressan – Dallas – 2019–21
Bruno Guarda – Dallas – 2008–12
Bruno Menezes – Chicago – 2007
Caio Alexandre – Vancouver – 2021–
Camilo Sanvezzo – Vancouver – 2011–13
Carlos Coronel – Philadelphia, New York Red Bulls – 2019, 2021–
Cássio – New England – 2005
Catê – New England – 2001
Célio Pompeu – St. Louis – 2023–
Daniel – San Jose – 2023–
Danilo Silva – MetroStars, Los Angeles FC – 2005, 2018–20
David Lopes – Chivas USA, LA Galaxy – 2011–12
Dejair – Chivas USA – 2008
Denílson – Dallas – 2007
Diego Walsh – Columbus, Kansas City – 2003–05
Douglas Costa – LA Galaxy – 2022–
Edu – Colorado – 2012
Eduardo – San Jose – 2010
Elias Manoel – New York Red Bulls – 2022–
Erick – Dallas – 2013
Evander – Portland – 2023–
Everton Luiz – Salt Lake – 2019–22
Fabinho – Philadelphia – 2013–19
Fábio – New York Red Bulls – 2021
Felipe – Montreal, New York Red Bulls, Vancouver, D.C. United, Austin – 2012–22
Fernando Bob – Minnesota – 2018
Fred – D.C. United, Philadelphia – 2007–11, 2014–15
Gabriel Pereira – New York City FC – 2022–
Geovane Jesus – Dallas – 2023–
Geovanni – San Jose – 2010
Getterson – Dallas – 2016
Gilberto – Toronto, Chicago – 2014–16
Gilberto Flores – MetroStars – 2004–05
Gilmar – Tampa Bay, MetroStars – 1997–98, 2001
Gláuber – Columbus – 2013
Gregore – Inter Miami – 2021–
Guido – MetroStars – 1997
Guly do Prado – Chicago – 2015
Héber – New York City FC, Seattle – 2019–
Ibson – Minnesota – 2017–18
Igor Julião – Kansas City – 2014, 2017
Ilsinho – Philadelphia – 2016–21
Jackson – Dallas, Toronto – 2010–15
Jean Mota – Inter Miami – 2022–
Jeanderson – Portland – 2015
Jéferson – Kansas City – 2011
João Batista – Tampa Bay – 1997
João Luiz – MetroStars – 1997
João Paulo – Seattle – 2020–
Judson – San Jose – 2019–
Júlio Baptista – Orlando – 2016
Júlio César – Kansas City – 2011–12
Júlio César – Toronto – 2014
Juninho – LA Galaxy, Chicago – 2010–15, 2017, 2019
Juninho Pernambucano – New York Red Bulls – 2013
Júnior Carreiro – D.C. United – 2010
Júnior Urso – Orlando – 2020–22
Kaká — Orlando — 2015–17
Klauss – St. Louis – 2023–
Kléberson – Philadelphia – 2013
Léo Chú – Seattle – 2021–
Leo Fernandes – Philadelphia – 2013–14, 2016
Léo Pereira – Orlando – 2017
Leonardo – LA Galaxy, Houston – 2010–11, 2013–18
Lucas Esteves – Colorado – 2021–22
Lucas Venuto – Vancouver – 2019
Luciano Emílio – D.C. United – 2007–10
Luiz Araújo – Atlanta – 2021–
Luiz Camargo – Houston – 2011–13
Luquinhas – New York Red Bulls – 2022–
Maciel – New England – 2021–
Maicon Santos – Chivas USA, Toronto, Dallas, D.C. United, Chicago – 2009–13
Marcelo – Chicago – 2019
Marcelo Saragosa – LA Galaxy, Dallas, Chivas USA, D.C. United – 2004–10, 2012–13
Marcelo Sarvas – LA Galaxy, Colorado, D.C. United – 2012–17
Marquinho – Colorado – 1998
Marquinhos Pedroso – Dallas, D.C. United – 2018–19
Matheus Aiás – Orlando – 2020–21
Matheus Davó – Philadelphia – 2021
Matheus Rossetto – Atlanta – 2020–
Matheus Silva – San Jose – 2016
Max – Colorado – 2022–
Maximiniano – Minnesota – 2018
Micael – Houston – 2022–
Michel – Dallas – 2013–15
Naldo – LA Galaxy – 2005–06
Nathan – San Jose – 2021–
Nathan Fogaça – Portland – 2022–
Paulinho McLaren – Miami Fusion – 1998
Pablo Campos – San Jose, Salt Lake – 2009–10
Paulo Jr. – Salt Lake – 2010–12
Paulo Nagamura – LA Galaxy, Toronto, Chivas USA, Kansas City – 2005–16
PC – Orlando, Vancouver – 2017–19
Pecka – Salt Lake – 2015
Pedro Ribeiro – Philadelphia, Orlando – 2014–16
Phelipe Megiolaro – Dallas – 2020–21
Rafael – D.C. United – 2013
Rafael Gomes – Colorado – 2008
Rafael Santos – Orlando – 2023–
Raphael Augusto – D.C. United – 2013
Ricardinho – Dallas – 2007–08
Ricardo Villar – Dallas – 2011–12
Ricardo Virtuoso – Columbus – 2006–07
Roberto Gaúcho – Miami Fusion – 1999
Roberto Linck – New England – 2010
Robinho – Columbus, Orlando – 2019–20
Rodrigo Faria – MetroStars, Chicago, San Jose – 2001–03
Rodrigo Ramos – Chicago – 2016
Rodrigues – San Jose – 2022–
Ruan – Orlando, D.C. United – 2019–
Samuel – LA Galaxy – 2014
Sérgio Santos – Philadelphia, Cincinnati – 2019–
Stefani Miglioranzi – LA Galaxy, Columbus, Philadelphia – 2006–11
Stefano Pinho – Orlando – 2018
Talles Magno – New York City FC – 2021–
Thiago – Chicago – 2005–07
Thiago – LA Galaxy – 2006
Thiago Andrade – New York City FC – 2021–
Thiago Fernandes – Houston – 2022
Thiago Martins – D.C. United, Chivas USA, New York Red Bulls, Colorado – 2003, 2005–06
Thiago Martins – New York City FC – 2022–
Thiago Santos – Dallas – 2020
Thomás – Seattle – 2015
Wélton – New England, LA Galaxy, Miami Fusion – 1996–2000
William Oliveira – Chicago – 2007
Zeca – Houston – 2022
Zico – San Jose – 1997

Chile 
Miguel Aceval – Toronto – 2012
Pablo Aránguiz – Dallas – 2018–19
José Bizama – Houston – 2019–21
Carlos Carmona – Atlanta – 2017
Carlos Farias – San Jose – 1999
Marcos González – Columbus – 2006–07
Felipe Gutiérrez – Kansas City, Colorado – 2018–19, 2022
Kevin Harbottle – Colorado – 2013
Pablo Hernández – D.C. United – 2010
Luis Marín – Kansas City – 2015
Victor Mella – San Jose, New England – 1996, 1998
Sebastián Miranda – Columbus – 2011–12
Milovan Mirošević – Columbus – 2012
Felipe Mora – Portland – 2020–
Pedro Morales – Vancouver – 2014–16
Raúl Palacios – Colorado – 2002
Robbie Robinson – Inter Miami – 2020–
Martín Rodríguez – D.C. United – 2022–
Sebastián Rozental – Columbus – 2006
Diego Rubio – Kansas City, Colorado – 2016–
Jeisson Vargas – Montreal – 2018
Marcelo Vega – MetroStars – 1998

Colombia 
Abel Aguilar – Dallas – 2018
Leonel Álvarez – Dallas, New England – 1996, 1998–2001
Pedro Álvarez – MetroStars – 2001
Rafael Amaya – San Jose, Colorado – 1996–97
Juan Pablo Ángel – New York Red Bulls, LA Galaxy, Chivas USA – 2007–12
Iván Angulo – Orlando – 2022–
Cristian Arango – Los Angeles FC – 2021–22
Victor Arboleda – Portland – 2017–18
Yair Arboleda – Houston – 2016
Santiago Arias – Cincinnati – 2023–
Jhonny Arteaga – New York Red Bulls – 2012
Dairon Asprilla – Portland – 2015–
Eduard Atuesta – Los Angeles FC – 2018–21
Michael Barrios – Dallas, Colorado – 2015–
Daniel Bedoya – New York City FC – 2019
Jair Benítez – Dallas – 2009–14
Dylan Borrero – New England – 2022–
Michael Bustamante – New York Red Bulls – 2014
Juan David Cabezas – Houston – 2017–19
Déiber Caicedo – Vancouver – 2021–
Juan Caicedo – New England – 2019
Luis Caicedo – New England, Houston – 2018–19, 2021, 2023–
Javier Calle – New York City FC – 2015
Fernando Cárdenas – New England – 2012
Juan Castilla – Houston – 2021
Fabián Castillo – Dallas – 2011–16
Jaime Castrillón – Colorado – 2012–13
Diego Chará – Portland – 2011–
Yimmi Chará – Portland – 2020–
Alex Comas – MetroStars – 2000–01
Wilman Conde – Chicago, New York Red Bulls – 2007–10, 2012
José Erick Correa – Chivas USA – 2012–13
Daniel Cruz – Dallas – 2011
Yamith Cuesta – Chivas USA, Chicago – 2009–11
Cristian Dájome – Vancouver – 2020–
Antony de Ávila – MetroStars – 1996–97
Jhon Durán – Chicago – 2022
Oscar Echeverry – New York Red Bulls – 2008
Andrés Escobar – Dallas – 2014
Pablo Escobar – Kansas City – 2010
David Ferreira – Dallas – 2009–13
Mender García – Minnesota – 2022–
Olmes García – Salt Lake – 2013–16
Andrés Gómez – Salt Lake – 2023–
Yeimar Gómez – Seattle – 2020–
Juan Diego González – Philadelphia – 2010
Yony González – LA Galaxy – 2020
Hárrison Henao – Colorado – 2012
Cucho Hernández – Columbus – 2022–
Rubén Darío Hernández – MetroStars – 1996
Sergio Herrera – Columbus – 2010
Cristian Higuita – Orlando – 2015–19
Jhon Kennedy Hurtado – Seattle, Chicago, Chivas USA – 2009–14
Carlos Lizarazo – Dallas – 2016
John Lozano – New England – 2012
Christian Mafla – New England – 2021
Mauro Manotas – Houston – 2015–20
Gonzalo Martínez – D.C. United – 2008
Jimmy Medranda – Kansas City, Nashville, Seattle, Columbus Crew – 2013–
Jefferson Mena – New York City FC – 2015–16
Stiven Mendoza – New York City FC – 2016
Germán Mera – Colorado – 2013
Faryd Mondragón – Philadelphia – 2011
Miguel Montaño – Seattle, Montreal – 2010–12
Fredy Montero – Seattle, Vancouver – 2009–12, 2017, 2019–
Pepe Moreno – New England – 2012
Santiago Moreno – Portland – 2021–
Tressor Moreno – San Jose – 2012
Edwin Mosquera – Atlanta – 2022–
Hanyer Mosquera – Portland – 2012
Juan Mosquera – Portland – 2022–
Santiago Mosquera – Dallas – 2018–20
Yerson Mosquera – Cincinnati – 2023–
José Mulato – Dallas – 2023–
Jesús Murillo – Los Angeles FC – 2020–
Cristian Nazarit – Chicago – 2011
Jáder Obrian – Dallas – 2021–
Jámison Olave – Salt Lake, New York Red Bulls – 2008–16
Juan Esteban Ortiz – Dallas – 2016
Lionard Pajoy – Philadelphia, D.C. United – 2012–13
Arley Palacios – MetroStars, Miami Fusion – 1998–99
Óscar Pareja – New England, Dallas – 1998–2005
Santiago Patiño – Orlando – 2019–20
Luis Perea – Dallas – 2012
John Wilmar Pérez – Columbus – 2000–02
Jorge Perlaza – Portland, Philadelphia – 2011–12
Hernán Pertúz – Dallas – 2012
Nelson Quiñónes – Houston – 2022–
Darwin Quintero – Minnesota, Houston – 2018–22
Wálter Restrepo – Philadelphia – 2016
Andrés Reyes – Inter Miami, New York Red Bulls – 2020–
Andrés Ricaurte – Dallas – 2020–21
Carlos Rivas – Orlando, New York Red Bulls – 2015–18
Nelson Rivas – Montreal – 2012
Rafael Robayo – Chicago – 2012
Ángelo Rodríguez – Minnesota – 2018–19
Emerson Rodríguez – Inter Miami – 2022
Milton Rodríguez – Dallas – 2010–11
Jhohan Romaña – Austin – 2021–22
Eddie Segura – Los Angeles FC – 2019–
Diego Serna – Miami Fusion, MetroStars, New England, LA Galaxy, Colorado – 1998–2003, 2005
Carlos Terán – Chicago – 2020–
Juan Toja – Dallas, New England – 2007–08, 2012–13
Róger Torres – Philadelphia – 2010–13
John Jairo Tréllez – Dallas – 1999
Iván Trujillo – Kansas City – 2008
Carlos Valderrama – Tampa Bay, Miami Fusion, Colorado – 1996–02
Carlos Valdés – Philadelphia – 2011–12, 2014
Adolfo Valencia – MetroStars – 2000–01
Jhojan Valencia – Austin – 2022–
John Valencia – Chivas USA – 2012
José Adolfo Valencia – Portland – 2013
Kerwin Vargas – Charlotte – 2022–
Sebastián Velásquez – Salt Lake, New York City FC – 2012–15
Henry Zambrano – MetroStars, Colorado, D.C. United – 1999–2000, 2002
Luis Zapata – Colorado – 2012

Ecuador 
Jordy Alcívar – Charlotte – 2022
Alexander Alvarado – Orlando – 2020–21
Juan Luis Anangonó – Chicago – 2013–14
Marco Angulo – Cincinnati – 2023–
Xavier Arreaga – Seattle – 2019–
Luis Bolaños – Chivas USA – 2014
Miller Bolaños – Chivas USA – 2012–13
Félix Borja – Chivas USA – 2014
Diego Calderón – Colorado – 2013
Leonardo Campana – Inter Miami – 2022–
José Cifuentes – Los Angeles FC – 2020–
Washington Corozo – Austin – 2022
Jhon Espinoza – Chicago – 2021–22
Michael Estrada – D.C. United – 2022
Víctor Estupiñán – Chivas USA – 2011
Alan Franco – Charlotte – 2022
Ariel Graziani – New England, Dallas, San Jose – 1999–2002
Carlos Gruezo – Dallas, San Jose – 2016–19, 2023–
Eduardo Hurtado – LA Galaxy, MetroStars, New England – 1996–2000
Romario Ibarra – Minnesota – 2018–19
Anderson Julio – Salt Lake – 2021–
Fausto Klinger – MetroStars – 2001
Martin Klinger – MetroStars – 2001
Sebas Méndez – Orlando, Los Angeles FC – 2019–22
Roberto Miña – Dallas – 2006–07
Oswaldo Minda – Chivas USA – 2012–14
Diego Palacios – Los Angeles FC – 2019–
Cristian Penilla – New England – 2018–20
Joao Plata – Toronto, Salt Lake – 2011–19
Joshué Quiñónez – Dallas – 2022
Wellington Sánchez – MetroStars, LA Galaxy – 1998
Gustavo Vallecilla – Cincinnati, Colorado – 2021–
Pedro Vite – Vancouver – 2022–
Edmundo Zura – San Jose – 2011

Paraguay 
Miguel Almirón – Atlanta – 2017–18
Luis Amarilla – Minnesota – 2020, 2022–
Pedro Báez – Salt Lake – 2016
Alan Benítez – Minnesota – 2022
Cristian Colmán – Dallas – 2017–18
Josué Colmán – Orlando – 2018–19
Andrés Cubas – Vancouver – 2022–
Cecilio Domínguez – Austin – 2021–22
Sebastián Ferreira – Houston – 2022–
Iván Franco – Houston – 2023–
Gastón Giménez – Chicago – 2020–
Kaku – New York Red Bulls – 2018–20
Jerry Laterza – LA Galaxy – 1997
Erik López – Atlanta – 2021
Líder Mármol – Chicago – 2008
Jesús Medina – New York City FC – 2018–21
Jorge Moreira – Portland – 2019–20
Braian Ojeda – Salt Lake – 2022–
Cristhian Paredes – Portland – 2018–
Rodney Redes – Austin – 2021–
Nelson Valdez – Seattle – 2015–16
Héctor Villalba – Atlanta – 2017–19

Peru 
Luis Abram – Atlanta – 2023–
José Alegría – D.C. United – 2001–03
Carlos Ascues – Orlando – 2018–19
Alexander Callens – New York City FC – 2017–22
Wilder Cartagena – Orlando – 2022–
José Carvallo – D.C. United – 2008
Carlo Chueca – Chivas USA – 2013
César Pizarro – San Jose – 2012
Collin Fernandez – Chicago – 2015–16
Raúl Fernández – Dallas – 2013–14
Edison Flores – D.C. United – 2020–22
Pedro Gallese – Orlando – 2020–
Alexi Gómez – Minnesota – 2018
Marcos López – San Jose – 2019–22
Andrés Mendoza – Columbus – 2010–11
Percy Olivares – Dallas – 2002
Andy Polo – Portland – 2018–21
Yordy Reyna – Vancouver, D.C. United, Charlotte – 2017–22
Raúl Ruidíaz – Seattle – 2018–
Waldir Sáenz – Colorado – 1998
Jerry Tamashiro – Miami Fusion – 1998
Miguel Trauco – San Jose – 2022–
Walter Vílchez – Chivas USA – 2013
Yoshimar Yotún – Orlando – 2017–18

Uruguay 
Nicolás Acevedo – New York City FC – 2020–22
José Aja – Orlando, Vancouver, Minnesota – 2016–18, 2020
César Araújo – Orlando – 2022–
Joaquín Ardaiz – Vancouver – 2019
Egidio Arévalo – Chicago – 2013
Jorge Bava – Chicago – 2017
Rodrigo Brasesco – D.C. United – 2011
Gastón Brugman – LA Galaxy – 2022–
Martín Cáceres – LA Galaxy – 2022–
José Cancela – New England, Colorado – 2003–07
Paolo Cardozo – LA Galaxy, Chivas USA – 2011–12
Manuel Castro – Atlanta – 2020
Thomás Chacón – Minnesota – 2019–20
Diego Cháves – Chicago – 2011
Guzmán Corujo – Charlotte – 2022–
Diego Fagúndez – New England, Austin – 2011–
Álvaro Fernández – Seattle, Chicago – 2010–12, 2016–17
Sebastián Fernández – Vancouver – 2014
Francisco Ginella – Los Angeles FC – 2020–22
Santiago González – Montreal – 2014
Mathías Laborda – Vancouver – 2023–
Nicolás Lodeiro – Seattle – 2016–
Alex Martínez – Kansas City – 2014
Enzo Martínez – Colorado – 2018
Nicolás Mezquida – Vancouver, Colorado – 2014–22
Lucas Monzón – New York Red Bulls – 2021–22
Martín Morales – Colorado – 2005
Adrián Paz – Columbus, Colorado – 1996–98
Mauricio Pereyra – Orlando – 2019–
Rodrigo Piñeiro – Nashville – 2021
Pablo Pintos – San Jose – 2014
Diego Polenta – LA Galaxy – 2019
Gastón Puerari – Chicago – 2011
Federico Puppo – Chicago – 2012
Yeferson Quintana – San Jose – 2018
Octavio Rivero – Vancouver – 2015–16
Brian Rodríguez – Los Angeles FC – 2019–22
Diego Rodríguez – Vancouver – 2015
Santiago Rodríguez – New York City FC – 2021–
Washington Rodríguez – Dallas – 1996
Diego Rossi – Los Angeles FC – 2018–21
Vicente Sánchez – Colorado, Houston – 2013–15, 2017
Marcelo Silva – Salt Lake – 2017–
Alejandro Silva – Montreal – 2018
Cristian Techera – Vancouver – 2015–18
David Texeira – Dallas – 2014–15
Facundo Torres – Orlando – 2022–
Agustín Viana – Columbus – 2013–14
Diego Viera – Tampa Bay – 1996

Venezuela 
Bernardo Añor – Columbus, Kansas City – 2011–15
Fernando Aristeguieta – Philadelphia – 2015
Anthony Blondell – Vancouver – 2018
Pablo Bonilla – Portland – 2020–
Jesús Bueno – Philadelphia – 2021–
Jhonder Cádiz – Nashville – 2020–21
Wikelman Carmona – New York Red Bulls – 2021–
Cristian Cásseres Jr. – New York Red Bulls – 2018–
Carlos Cermeño – Dallas – 2017
Gabriel Cichero – New York Red Bulls – 2008
Sergio Córdova – Salt Lake, Vancouver – 2022–
Rolf Feltscher – LA Galaxy – 2018–20
Alejandro Fuenmayor – Houston – 2018–21
Erickson Gallardo – Toronto – 2019–20
Luis González – Dallas – 2017
José Hernández – Atlanta – 2018
Ronald Hernández – Atlanta – 2021–
Yangel Herrera – New York City FC – 2017–18
Christian Makoun – Inter Miami, Charlotte, New England – 2020–
Giancarlo Maldonado – Chivas USA – 2010
José Andrés Martínez – Philadelphia – 2020–
Josef Martínez – Atlanta, Inter Miami – 2017–
Alejandro Moreno – LA Galaxy, San Jose, Houston, Columbus, Philadelphia, Chivas USA – 2002–12
Júnior Moreno – D.C. United, Cincinnati – 2018–
Alberto Munoz – Tampa Bay – 2001
Miguel Navarro – Chicago – 2020–
Ronaldo Peña – Houston – 2018–20
Daniel Pereira – Austin – 2021–
Jeizon Ramírez – Salt Lake – 2020
Emilio Rentería – Columbus – 2009–12
Gelmin Rivas – D.C. United – 2020
Angel Rivillo – Dallas – 2000
Jorge Rojas – New York Red Bulls – 2008–09
Rafael Romo – D.C. United – 2022
Giovanni Savarese – MetroStars, New England, San Jose – 1996–99, 2000
Jefferson Savarino – Salt Lake – 2017–19, 2022–
Eduardo Sosa – Columbus – 2018
Yeferson Soteldo – Toronto – 2021
Freddy Vargas – Dallas – 2021
Renzo Zambrano – Portland – 2019–21

Oceania (OFC)

New Zealand 
Noah Billingsley – Minnesota – 2020
Michael Boxall – Vancouver, Minnesota – 2011, 2017–
Andrew Boyens – Toronto, New York Red Bulls, Chivas USA, LA Galaxy – 2007–09, 2011–12
Jeremy Brockie – Toronto – 2013
Elliot Collier – Chicago – 2018, 2020–21
Kip Colvey – San Jose, Colorado – 2016, 2018
Simon Elliott – LA Galaxy, Columbus, San Jose, Chivas USA – 1999–2005, 2009, 2011
Jake Gleeson – Portland – 2011, 2016–18
Dan Keat – LA Galaxy – 2011–12
Cameron Knowles – Salt Lake – 2005
Tony Lochhead – New England, Chivas USA – 2006, 2014
Stefan Marinovic – Vancouver – 2017–18
James Musa – Kansas City, Minnesota – 2017, 2020
Ryan Nelsen – D.C. United – 2001–04
Duncan Oughton – Columbus – 2001–04, 2006–10
Winston Reid – Kansas City – 2020
Jarrod Smith – Toronto – 2008
Tommy Smith – Colorado – 2018–19
Bill Tuiloma – Portland, Charlotte – 2018–
Deklan Wynne – Colorado – 2018–19

Notes

References

See also

MLS International Roster Slots
List of current Major League Soccer players with national team caps

MLS players, foreign
Major League Soccer lists
United States
 
 
Association football player non-biographical articles